= Dangcagan =

Municipality in Bukidnon, Philippines

- Municipality
- Municipality of Dangcagan
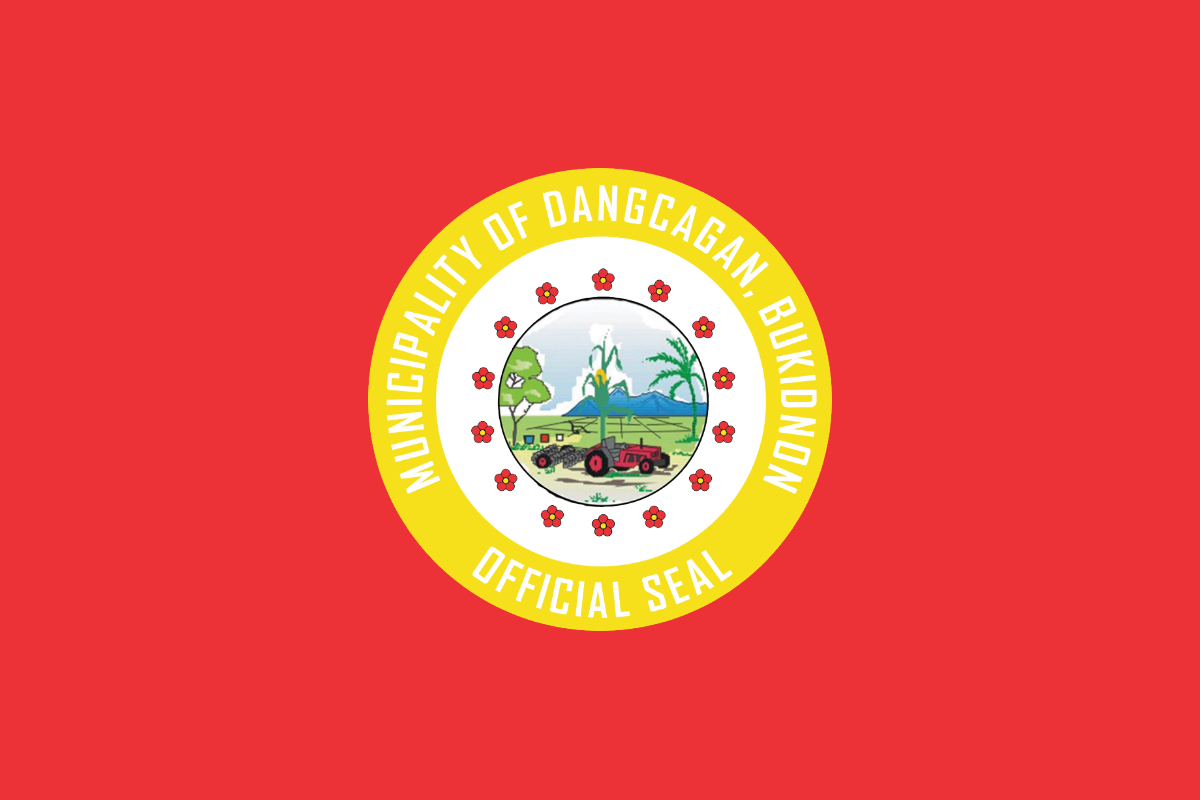
- Flag Seal

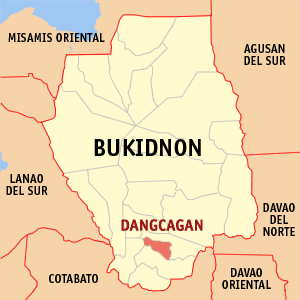
- Map of Bukidnon with Dangcagan highlighted
- Interactive map of Dangcagan
- Location within the Philippines
- Coordinates: 7°36′43″N 125°00′10″E
- Country: Philippines
- Region: Northern Mindanao
- Province: Bukidnon
- District: 3rd district
- Barangays: 14 (see Barangays)

Government
  - Type: Sangguniang Bayan
  - Mayor: Mark Vincent B. Dandasan
  - Vice Mayor: Fruto B. Dandasan, Jr.
  - Representative: Audrey Tan-Zubiri
  - Municipal Council: Members: Jesus D. Durog Jr.; Henry A. Lopina; Genaro O. Guipetacio; Eugen V. Amisola; Anna Zenaida D. Igtos; Serville M. Cabunoc; Emeterio L. Andoy; Alexander V. Bautista
  - Electorate: 18,916 voters (2025)

Area
  - Total: 422.69 km^{2} (163.20 sq mi)
- Elevation: 340 m (1,120 ft)
- Highest elevation: 414 m (1,358 ft)
- Lowest elevation: 186 m (610 ft)

Population (2024 census)
  - Total: 27,128
  - Density: 64.179/km^{2} (166.22/sq mi)
  - Households: 6,015

Economy
  - Income class: 1st municipal income class
  - Poverty incidence: 27.77% (2023)
  - Revenue: ₱ 295.5 million (2024)
  - Assets: ₱ 736.2 million (2024)
  - Expenditure: ₱ 264.1 million (2024)
  - Liabilities: ₱ 151.6 million (2024)

Service provider
  - Electricity: First Bukidnon Electric Cooperative (FIBECO)
- Time zone: UTC+8 (PST)
- ZIP code: 8719
- PSGC: 1001303000
- IDD : area code: +63 (0)88
- Native languages: Western Bukidnon Manobo; Binukid; Cebuano; Ata Manobo; Tagalog
- Website: www.dangcaganbuk.gov.ph

Dangcagan, officially the Municipality of Dangcagan (Cebuano: Lungsod sa Dangcagan; Tagalog: Bayan ng Dangcagan), is a municipality in the province of Bukidnon, Philippines. According to the 2024 census, it has a population of 27,128 people, making it the least populated municipality in the province.

== History ==
Dangcagan used to be an abode of the Manobos under the leadership of Datu Dangaan (meaning “to praise”), a prominent chieftain ruler known for his courage and affluence. The place was then a little Sitio of Maramag. As the Christian settlers from Luzon & Visayas began to flock and settle in the area, Datu Dangaan followers ran and hid their families in the forest and returned to their home only when they knew the settlers were not around.

This leads the settler to call the “Dagandagan”. It took ample time for the settler to befriend the natives. When the natives and the Christian settlers finally united, they made representation to the Municipal Government of Maramag to form a regular barrio within the territory of Datu Dangaan. They agreed to call the barrio Dangcagan in honor of the natives.

The first set of officers was headed by Mayor Vicente Cabiling, originally appointed to the position in 1961 and was elected and served for ten (10) consecutive years, he constructed the old Municipal Hall on top of the hill in the poblacion. And from 1972 until March 1986 Mayor Fruto Ll. Dandasan assumed the office. During his time he constructed new roads and maintained the barangay road network of Dangcagan

In 1992, Mayor Norberta B. Dandasan assumed as Municipal Mayor until June 1995. She pursued the programs and projects that were initiated by her late husband and other predecessors. The municipal gymnasium was completed.

In the May 1995 election, Roberto Cabunoc took over the mayorship of the town and implemented the road concreting projects, beautification of the municipal plaza, installation of water system, construction of the new municipal hall and completion of different barangay projects. After three terms of Mayor Cabunoc, Mayor Edilberto F. Ayuban followed with 3 consecutive terms.

In the mayoral election of 2013, Mayor Fruto B. Dandasan who used to be one of the town's elected councilor, became the town vice mayor for two consecutive terms and now elected as the municipal mayor of the town.

== Geography ==
Dangcagan is located in the southern part of the province. It is 72 kilometres (45 mi) from the provincial capital, Malaybalay City, and 162 kilometres (101 mi) from regional center, Cagayan de Oro, which is the main outlet for its agricultural products. The town is sandwiched by municipality of Kitaotao in the northern and eastern part, by Kibawe, in its southern part and by Kadingilan on its western part. The Pulangi River and Muleta River serves as its natural boundary with Kitaotao (eastern side) and Kadingilan (western side), respectively.

The municipality has an aggregate land area of more or less 42,269 hectares (104,450 acres).

=== Climate ===
It has distinct dry and wet season; the wettest month is usually September and the driest month is March.

Climate data for Dancagan, Bukidnon
Month	Jan	Feb	Mar	Apr	May	Jun	Jul	Aug	Sep	Oct	Nov	Dec	Year
Mean daily maximum °C (°F)	28 (82)	28 (82)	29 (84)	31 (88)	30 (86)	29 (84)	28 (82)	29 (84)	29 (84)	29 (84)	29 (84)	29 (84)	29 (84)
Mean daily minimum °C (°F)	20 (68)	20 (68)	20 (68)	21 (70)	22 (72)	22 (72)	22 (72)	22 (72)	22 (72)	22 (72)	21 (70)	20 (68)	21 (70)
Average precipitation mm (inches)	44 (1.7)	27 (1.1)	32 (1.3)	35 (1.4)	76 (3.0)	117 (4.6)	108 (4.3)	108 (4.3)	94 (3.7)	100 (3.9)	76 (3.0)	46 (1.8)	863 (34.1)
Average rainy days	10.3	8.1	8.5	9.6	21.0	24.9	25.0	24.2	22.5	23.4	17.7	11.4	206.6
Source: Meteoblue (modeled/calculated data, not measured locally)

=== Soil and topography ===
It has a fertile soil ranging from clay to sandy loam. Its topography is 70% flat and 30% rolling, which is suitable for agricultural crops such as corn, rice and other commercial crops like coconut, coffee, cacao, rubber, banana and sugar cane.

=== Barangays ===
Dangcagan is politically subdivided into 14 barangays. Each barangay consists of puroks while some have sitios.

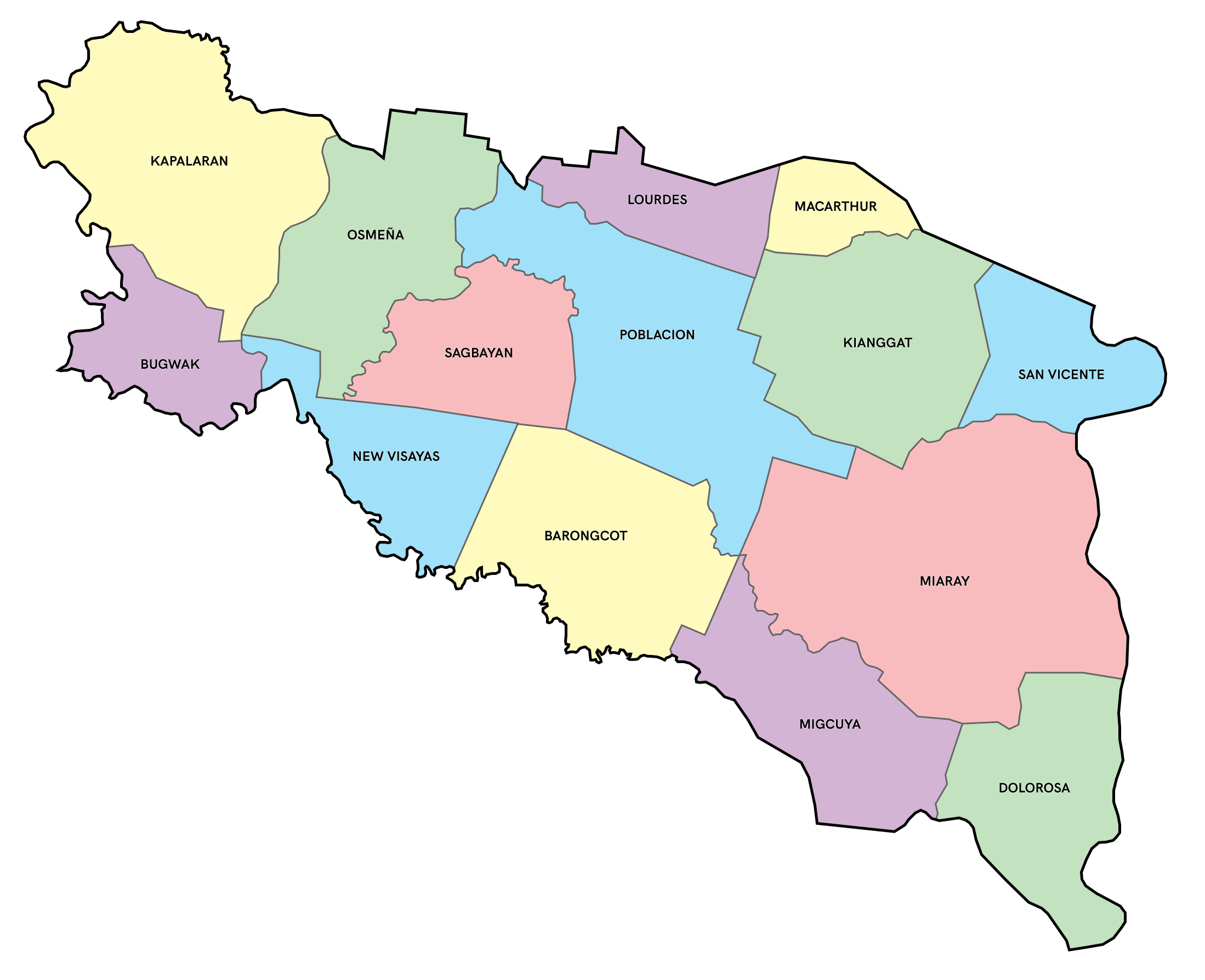
Map of Dangcagan showing barangays under its jurisdiction.

PSGC	Barangay	Population			±% p.a.	
		2024		2010		
101303001	Barongcot	8.1%	2,192	2,006	▴	0.62%
101303002	Bugwak	2.4%	653	596	▴	0.64%
101303003	Dolorosa	4.2%	1,134	1,015	▴	0.77%
101303004	Kapalaran	5.5%	1,503	1,458	▴	0.21%
101303005	Kianggat	6.1%	1,654	1,527	▴	0.56%
101303006	Lourdes	2.3%	636	749	▾	−1.13%
101303007	Macarthur	3.0%	822	802	▴	0.17%
101303008	Miaray	13.3%	3,607	3,268	▴	0.69%
101303009	Migcuya	4.0%	1,094	1,075	▴	0.12%
101303010	New Visayas	3.7%	995	977	▴	0.13%
101303011	Osmeña	5.5%	1,487	1,383	▴	0.51%
101303012	Poblacion	22.0%	5,956	5,782	▴	0.21%
101303013	Sagbayan	4.0%	1,093	1,019	▴	0.49%
101303014	San Vicente	3.3%	897	791	▴	0.88%
	Total		27,128	22,448	▴	1.32%

== Demographics ==
Population census of Dangcagan
Year	Pop.	±% p.a.
1970	13,464	—
1975	13,386	−0.12%
1980	13,652	+0.39%
1990	14,823	+0.83%
1995	16,660	+2.21%
2000	18,857	+2.69%
2007	21,254	+1.66%
2010	22,448	+2.01%
2015	23,723	+1.06%
2020	26,076	+2.01%
2024	27,128	+0.95%
Source: Philippine Statistics Authority

In the 2024 census, the population of Dangcagan was 27,128 people, with a density of 64 inhabitants per square kilometre or 170 inhabitants per square mile.

=== Languages and dialects ===
The majority of the municipality's inhabitants speak Cebuano, although some inhabitants also speak the Hiligaynon/Ilonggo language and many still speak Binukid (Manobo language).

== Economy ==
Poverty incidence of Dangcagan (%)

Source: Philippine Statistics Authority
