= Kitaotao =

Municipality in Bukidnon, Philippines

- Municipality
- Municipality of Kitaotao
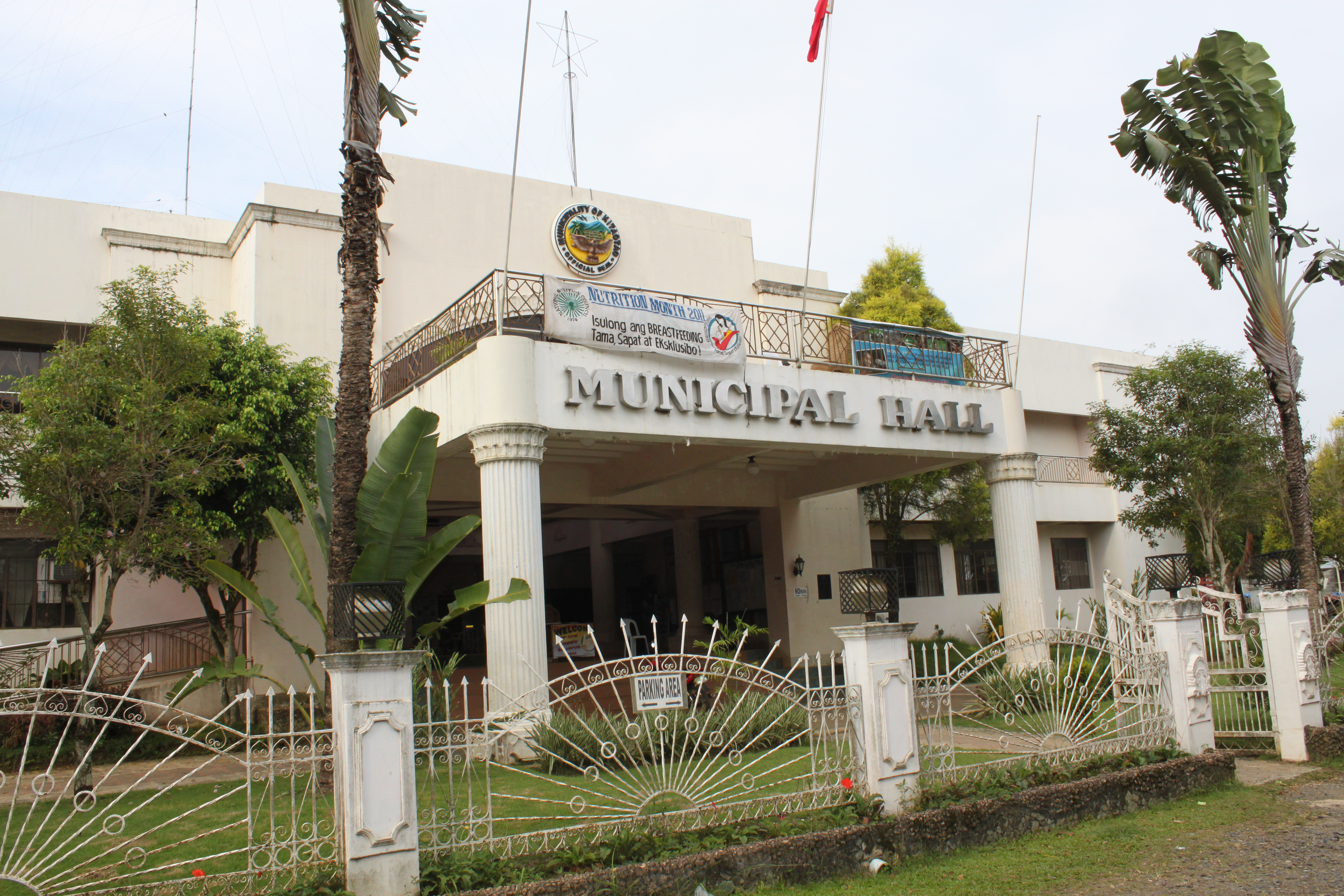
- Municipal hall

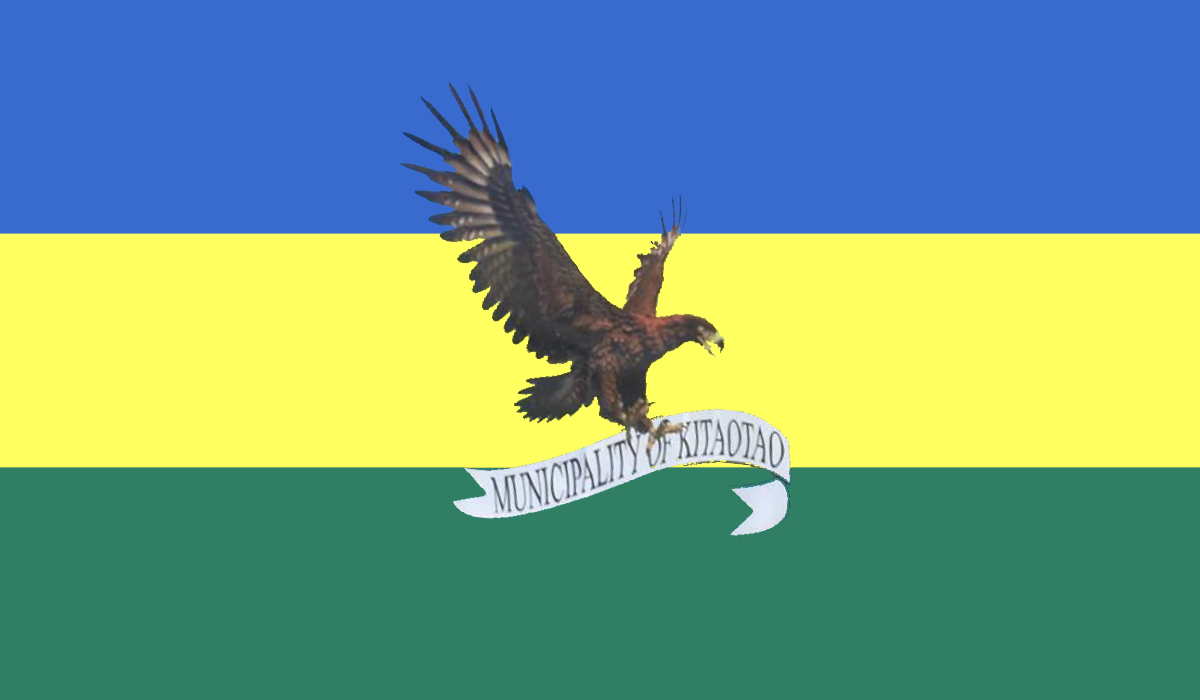
- Flag Seal
- Nicknames: Municipality at the hips of Bukidnon; Mango Capital of Bukidnon
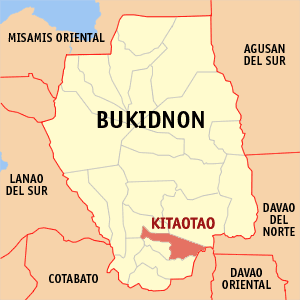
- Map of Bukidnon with Kitaotao highlighted
- Interactive map of Kitaotao
- Location within the Philippines
- Coordinates: 7°38′26″N 125°00′31″E
- Country: Philippines
- Region: Northern Mindanao
- Province: Bukidnon
- District: 3rd district
- Founded: June 18, 1966
- Barangays: 35 (see Barangays)

Government
  - Type: Sangguniang Bayan
  - Mayor: Edwin P. Abucayan
  - Vice Mayor: Mary Ann G. Angit
  - Representative: Audrey Zubiri
  - Municipal Council: Members: Mary Ann G. Angit; Roelito A. Gawilan; Donato U. Aligato; Edgardo B. Rafisura; Eduardo C. Beltran; Socrates D. Ofima; Rufino L. Tambog; Evangeline P. Gubaton
  - Electorate: 33,801 voters (2025)

Area
  - Total: 788.78 km^{2} (304.55 sq mi)
- Elevation: 327 m (1,073 ft)
- Highest elevation: 393 m (1,289 ft)
- Lowest elevation: 219 m (719 ft)

Population (2024 census)
  - Total: 57,364
  - Density: 72.725/km^{2} (188.36/sq mi)
  - Households: 12,835

Economy
  - Income class: 1st municipal income class
  - Poverty incidence: 30.51% (2023)
  - Revenue: ₱ 501.9 million (2024)
  - Assets: ₱ 1,284 million (2024)
  - Expenditure: ₱ 480.1 million (2024)
  - Liabilities: ₱ 569 million (2024)

Service provider
  - Electricity: First Bukidnon Electric Cooperative (FIBECO)
- Time zone: UTC+8 (PST)
- ZIP code: 8716
- PSGC: 1001309000
- IDD : area code: +63 (0)88
- Native languages: Western Bukidnon Manobo; Binukid; Cebuano; Ata Manobo; Tagalog
- Website: www.kitaotaobuk.gov.ph

Kitaotao, officially the Municipality of Kitaotao (Cebuano: Lungsod sa Kitaotao; Tagalog: Bayan ng Kitaotao), is a municipality in the province of Bukidnon, Philippines. According to the 2024 census, it has a population of 57,364 people.

== History ==
=== Cultural ===
During the Spanish regime, a Manobo Tribe in Bukidnon, headed by Datu Tayaotao, was known among its neighboring settlements for his bravery and leadership. When the Spaniards invaded Cotabato, in one of their drives to expand their colonial control over the Philippines, Datu Tayaotao was called upon for help by one Datu Muslim. The combined forces of the Muslims and Manobo successfully repulsed the Spanish operation.

A feast was declared by the Muslim chief to honor and thank Datu Tayaotao and his men. During the feast, the Muslim chief offered his only daughter to Datu Tayaotao to be his wife, as reward and bond, to strengthen the relation of the two tribes.

The wedding took place at Datu Tayaotao's enclave, followed by a three-day feast. The Muslim Datu, overwhelmed by the gaiety and lavishness of the celebration, proclaimed and called Datu Tayaotao as Datu Kitaotao, the chief of the land of wealth. After his death, the locality was named after Datu Kitaotao.

=== Political ===
Kitaotao was once part of the district of Maramag. The creation of Kibawe in 1956 as a new district reclassified Kitaotao as part of Kibawe. After the Second World War, municipalities were created from the existing district and some settlements. In 1961, President Carlos P. Garcia issued Executive Order No. 444 for the creation of the municipality.

Under the sponsorship of Bukidnon Congressman Benjamin Tabios, House Bill No. 1655 was passed by Congress and approved by President Ferdinand E. Marcos as Republic Act No. 4801 for the creation of Kitaotao into a municipality on June 16, 1966. Its first political election was held in November 1967, electing Eusebio B. Pabualan as Kitaotao's first municipal mayor. At present, Kitaotao is composed of 35 barangays and 108 sitios, with an approximate area of 52, 512 hectares.

== Geography ==
Kitaotao is situated in the southern part of Bukidnon. It lies in the 124°24’ east longitude and 7°40’ to 7°39 south longitude. It is bounded in the north by the municipalities of Don Carlos, Quezon and San Fernando; and the municipalities of Kadingilan, Dangcagan, and Kibawe in the west; and then the Municipality of Arakan, Cotabato Province in the south and Davao City in the east.

=== Barangays ===
Kitaotao is politically subdivided into 35 barangays. Each barangay consists of puroks while some have sitios.

PSGC	Barangay	Population			±% p.a.	
		2024		2010		
101309001	Balangigay	1.9%	1,088	989	▴	0.66%
101309002	Balocbocan	3.0%	1,717	1,592	▴	0.53%
101309003	Bershiba	1.7%	949	884	▴	0.49%
101309004	Bobong	1.1%	629	948	▾	−2.81%
101309005	Bolocaon	1.4%	794	656	▴	1.33%
101309006	Cabalantian	1.4%	812	560	▴	2.61%
101309007	Calapaton	1.3%	731	776	▾	−0.41%
101309009	Sinaysayan (Dalurong)	1.6%	941	785	▴	1.27%
101309010	Kahusayan	2.5%	1,436	1,415	▴	0.10%
101309011	Kalumihan	1.1%	656	474	▴	2.28%
101309012	Kauyonan	2.0%	1,167	1,118	▴	0.30%
101309013	Kimolong	1.8%	1,018	948	▴	0.50%
101309014	Kitaihon	0.9%	544	550	▾	−0.08%
101309015	Kitobo	4.5%	2,601	2,371	▴	0.64%
101309019	Magsaysay	1.2%	660	499	▴	1.96%
101309020	Malobalo	1.1%	650	605	▴	0.50%
101309021	Metebagao	1.3%	747	788	▾	−0.37%
101309022	Sagundanon	2.0%	1,171	1,262	▾	−0.52%
101309023	Pagan	2.3%	1,333	1,274	▴	0.31%
101309025	Panganan	2.5%	1,457	1,216	▴	1.26%
101309026	Poblacion	9.1%	5,221	4,927	▴	0.40%
101309028	San Isidro	2.1%	1,210	1,064	▴	0.90%
101309029	San Lorenzo	1.4%	789	681	▴	1.03%
101309030	Sto. Rosario	1.5%	878	703	▴	1.56%
101309031	Sinuda (Simod)	13.2%	7,580	8,725	▾	−0.97%
101309032	Tandong	1.4%	806	864	▾	−0.48%
101309033	Tawas	3.3%	1,896	2,274	▾	−1.25%
101309034	White Kulaman	4.4%	2,532	2,260	▴	0.79%
101309035	Napalico	1.3%	765	587	▴	1.86%
101309037	Digongan	2.9%	1,680	1,505	▴	0.77%
101309038	Kiulom	1.5%	847	626	▴	2.12%
101309039	Binoongan	1.1%	640	506	▴	1.64%
101309040	Kipilas	1.7%	965	1,379	▾	−2.45%
101309041	East Dalurong	2.4%	1,369	1,814	▾	−1.94%
101309042	West Dalurong	3.5%	1,981	1,863	▴	0.43%
	Total		57,364	49,488	▴	1.03%

=== Topography ===
The area along the Sayre Highway is a plateau while the eastern portion including the Upper Pulangi region is mostly rolling hills with varying mountain slopes.

There are several mountains along the Cotabato-Davao del Norte Border. Foremost of them are Mt. Sinaka, Mt. Malambo, Mt. Molawit, Mt. Makaayat, Mt. Kibinaton, Mt. Mahanao, Mt. Sumalili, Mt. Zita, and Mt. Kibanda which serve as the sanctuaries of the rare Philippine wildlife. It featured also the numerous waterfalls such as Sumalili, Kinanoran, Matigol and Lalapoy Falls which can be found in the Upper Pulangi region.

Drainage is generally directed southwards where the principal rivers: Pulangi, Muleta, Kulaman, Rawari, Zita, and Salog River.

=== Climate ===
Climate data for Kitaotao, Bukidnon
Month	Jan	Feb	Mar	Apr	May	Jun	Jul	Aug	Sep	Oct	Nov	Dec	Year
Mean daily maximum °C (°F)	28 (82)	28 (82)	29 (84)	30 (86)	30 (86)	29 (84)	28 (82)	29 (84)	29 (84)	29 (84)	29 (84)	29 (84)	29 (84)
Mean daily minimum °C (°F)	20 (68)	20 (68)	20 (68)	21 (70)	22 (72)	22 (72)	22 (72)	22 (72)	22 (72)	22 (72)	21 (70)	20 (68)	21 (70)
Average precipitation mm (inches)	44 (1.7)	27 (1.1)	32 (1.3)	35 (1.4)	76 (3.0)	117 (4.6)	108 (4.3)	108 (4.3)	94 (3.7)	100 (3.9)	76 (3.0)	46 (1.8)	863 (34.1)
Average rainy days	10.3	8.1	8.5	9.6	21.0	24.9	25.0	24.2	22.5	23.4	17.7	11.4	206.6
Source: Meteoblue

== Demographics ==
Population census of Kitaotao
Year	Pop.	±% p.a.
1970	14,708	—
1975	22,779	+9.17%
1980	29,497	+5.30%
1990	34,472	+1.57%
1995	38,404	+2.04%
2000	37,733	−0.38%
2007	42,212	+1.56%
2010	49,488	+5.96%
2015	50,260	+0.30%
2020	53,796	+1.44%
2024	57,364	+1.55%
Source: Philippine Statistics Authority

In the 2024 census, the population of Kitaotao was 57,364 people, with a density of 73 inhabitants per square kilometre or 190 inhabitants per square mile.

== Economy ==
Poverty incidence of Kitaotao (%)

Source: Philippine Statistics Authority
