= Damulog =

Municipality in Bukidnon, Philippines

- Municipality
- Municipality of Damulog
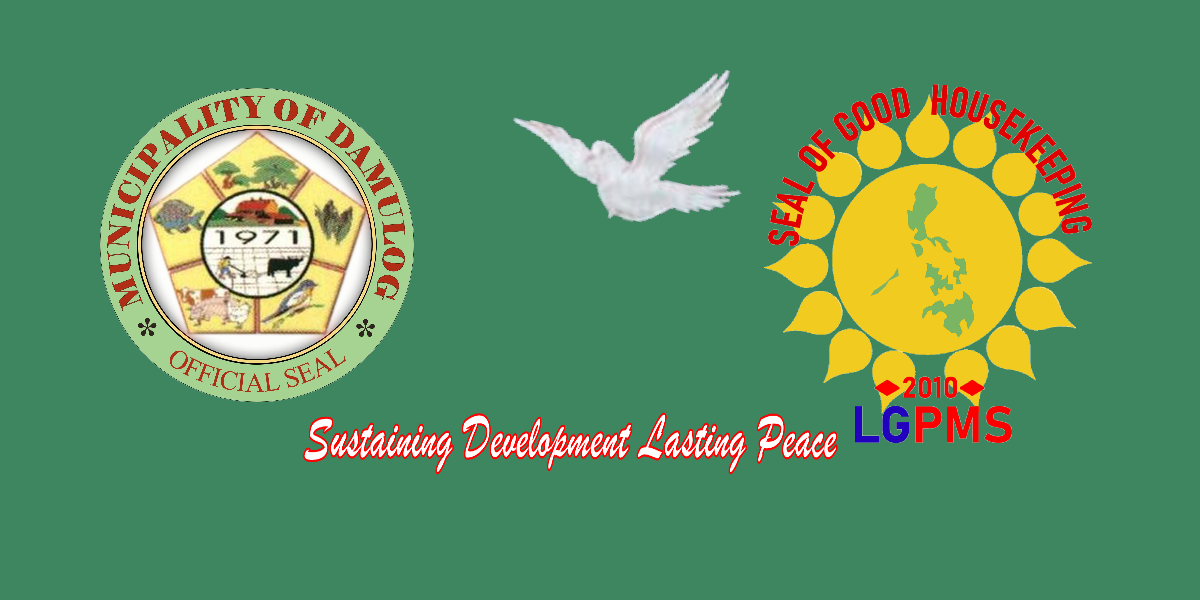
- Flag Seal
- Nicknames: Passway to Northern Mindanao; Land of the Virgin Nature
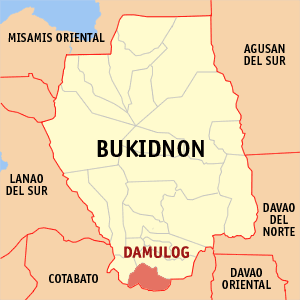
- Map of Bukidnon with Damulog highlighted
- Interactive map of Damulog
- Location within the Philippines
- Coordinates: 7°29′07″N 124°56′28″E
- Country: Philippines
- Region: Northern Mindanao
- Province: Bukidnon
- District: 3rd district
- Founded: August 16, 1971
- Barangays: 17 (see Barangays)

Government
  - Type: Sangguniang Bayan
  - Mayor: Melino L. Buro
  - Vice Mayor: Alberto G. Salmasan
  - Representative: Audrey Tan-Zubiri
  - Municipal Council: Members: Sammuel V. Gogo; Marino B. Tagarda; Gerald E. Quia-ot; Danielo G. Bellezas; Ernesto S. Cabillar; Amelito G. Tero; Vicente C. Badic; Ernesto G. Lundas Jr.
  - Electorate: 21,655 voters (2025)

Area
  - Total: 244.19 km^{2} (94.28 sq mi)
- Elevation: 260 m (850 ft)
- Highest elevation: 550 m (1,800 ft)
- Lowest elevation: 89 m (292 ft)

Population (2024 census)
  - Total: 38,564
  - Density: 157.93/km^{2} (409.03/sq mi)
  - Households: 9,284

Economy
  - Income class: 2nd municipal income class
  - Poverty incidence: 35.36% (2023)
  - Revenue: ₱ 232.1 million (2024)
  - Assets: ₱ 760.3 million (2024)
  - Expenditure: ₱ 220.6 million (2024)
  - Liabilities: ₱ 130.5 million (2024)

Service provider
  - Electricity: First Bukidnon Electric Cooperative (FIBECO)
- Time zone: UTC+8 (PST)
- ZIP code: 8721
- PSGC: 1001302000
- IDD : area code: +63 (0)88
- Native languages: Binukid; Cebuano; Ata Manobo; Ilianen; Matigsalug; Tagalog; Maguindanaon
- Website: www.damulogbuk.gov.ph

Damulog, officially the Municipality of Damulog (Cebuano: Lungsod sa Damulog; Tagalog: Bayan ng Damulog), is a municipality in the province of Bukidnon, Philippines. According to the 2024 census, it has a population of 38,564 people.

== History ==
Historically, the first settlers of Damulog were indigenous people, the Manobo. Oral tradition says the area was named "Ramulog", meaning "a place to bathe", as a river where the Manobo washed is now in the town proper. It also became a gathering place, where men would fish as their wives washed clothes, and children would swim or collect shells. Over time, "Ramulog" changed to "Damulog" due to assimilation of the Manobos and the new settlers, and the river is now called Damulog River.

The opening of the Sayre Highway in 1953 opened Damulog to external trade. Manobos and Maguindanaons from nearby Cotabato gathered abacá from the forests and sold it to traders. These traders processed the abacá into raw fibre and resold these in Cagayan de Oro. More immigrants from the Visayas came and started to acquire farm lots, and gradually, the new settlers dominated trade and business.

Damulog celebrates its Araw ng Damulog every 16 August with exhilarating activities that comprehends every walk of life. The municipality celebrates its town fiesta every 7 October, in honor of Our Lady of the Most Holy Rosary. In line are different activities that draw many expectators from other municipalities and neighboring towns.

=== Political development ===
Damulog was once a barrio of Kibawe, and officially created a regular Municipality in January 1972 pursuant to Republic Act No. 6369. The author was Congressman César "Titang" Fortich. The approval was on August 16, 1971, and Damulog started as municipality in 1972. Presently, the municipality has seventeen (17) regular barangays, namely: Aludas, Angga-an, Kinapat, Kiraon, Kitingting, Lagandang, Macapari, Maican, Migcawayan, New Compostela, Old Damulog, Omonay, Poblacion, Pocopoco, Sampagar, San Isidro, and Tangkulan.

It is difficult to trace the political lineage of the town prior to Damulog becoming a municipality. The capitán del barrio then was Tito C. Balangyao who assumed as mayor upon its creation as a municipality in 1972. He remained mayor until March 1980, when Emiterio D. Luis won the mayoralty election. In the aftermath of the 1986 People Power Revolution, wherein dictator Ferdinand E. Marcos, Sr was ousted and Corazon C. Aquino installed as President, the revolutionary government subsequently replaced Luis with Erlito Bagas as Officer-In-Charge (OIC) in the Office of the Mayor. After about two months, Rev. Romeo P. Tiongco assumed as mayor. He relinquished his post a year after wherein then Vice-Mayor Basílio Beltrán assumed the top post.

In 1992 election, Emiterio D. Luis again won the mayoralty post. It was during his term that RA 7160 (the Local Government Code of 1991) was implemented. It was also this time that local governance became multidisciplinary and multifaceted. He finished his three terms in 1998.

In July 1998, Josefina G. Tero was elected as the first female mayor, serving for one term. She was succeeded by Fortunato E. Gudito, a retired military intelligence officer, who won the May 2001 local election and served two terms.

In the May 2007 elections, Romeo P. Tiongco contested Gudito and won. He is the incumbent mayor of Damulog.

== Geography ==
=== Barangays ===
Damulog is politically subdivided into 17 barangays. Each barangay consists of puroks while some have sitios.

| PSGC | Barangay | Population | | | ±% p.a. | |
| | | 2024 | | 2010 | | |
|---|---|---|---|---|---|---|
| 101302001 | Aludas | 1.2% | 448 | 471 | ▾ | −0.35% |
| 101302002 | Angga‑an | 5.5% | 2,121 | 1,320 | ▴ | 3.35% |
| 101302003 | Tangkulan (Jose Rizal) | 6.2% | 2,406 | 2,040 | ▴ | 1.15% |
| 101302004 | Kinapat | 1.6% | 608 | 550 | ▴ | 0.70% |
| 101302005 | Kiraon | 1.6% | 602 | 586 | ▴ | 0.19% |
| 101302006 | Kitingting | 1.9% | 734 | 726 | ▴ | 0.08% |
| 101302007 | Lagandang | 3.2% | 1,225 | 1,060 | ▴ | 1.01% |
| 101302008 | Macapari | 3.2% | 1,247 | 1,255 | ▾ | −0.04% |
| 101302009 | Maican | 2.4% | 943 | 989 | ▾ | −0.33% |
| 101302010 | Migcawayan | 4.0% | 1,528 | 1,389 | ▴ | 0.67% |
| 101302011 | New Compostela | 3.3% | 1,265 | 1,066 | ▴ | 1.20% |
| 101302013 | Old Damulog | 4.1% | 1,593 | 1,546 | ▴ | 0.21% |
| 101302014 | Omonay | 16.9% | 6,523 | 4,549 | ▴ | 2.54% |
| 101302015 | Poblacion (New Damulog) | 11.4% | 4,382 | 4,349 | ▴ | 0.05% |
| 101302016 | Pocopoco | 3.2% | 1,230 | 880 | ▴ | 2.35% |
| 101302017 | Sampagar | 6.7% | 2,571 | 2,019 | ▴ | 1.69% |
| 101302019 | San Isidro | 2.3% | 876 | 743 | ▴ | 1.15% |
| | Total | | 38,564 | 25,538 | ▴ | 2.91% |

=== Climate ===
Climate data for Damulog, Bukidnon
| Month | Jan | Feb | Mar | Apr | May | Jun | Jul | Aug | Sep | Oct | Nov | Dec | Year |
|---|---|---|---|---|---|---|---|---|---|---|---|---|---|
| Mean daily maximum °C (°F) | 29 (84) | 29 (84) | 30 (86) | 31 (88) | 29 (84) | 28 (82) | 28 (82) | 29 (84) | 29 (84) | 29 (84) | 29 (84) | 29 (84) | 29 (84) |
| Mean daily minimum °C (°F) | 20 (68) | 19 (66) | 20 (68) | 21 (70) | 22 (72) | 22 (72) | 22 (72) | 22 (72) | 22 (72) | 22 (72) | 21 (70) | 20 (68) | 21 (70) |
| Average precipitation mm (inches) | 46 (1.8) | 35 (1.4) | 41 (1.6) | 38 (1.5) | 67 (2.6) | 79 (3.1) | 68 (2.7) | 66 (2.6) | 52 (2.0) | 59 (2.3) | 62 (2.4) | 45 (1.8) | 658 (25.8) |
| Average rainy days | 11.4 | 9.7 | 12.3 | 14.1 | 22.1 | 23.7 | 22.7 | 21.8 | 19.2 | 21.8 | 20.2 | 14.8 | 213.8 |
Source: Meteoblue (modeled/calculated data, not measured locally)

== Demographics ==
Population census of Damulog
| Year | Pop. | ±% p.a. |
|---|---|---|
| 1975 | 10,594 | — |
| 1980 | 12,596 | +3.52% |
| 1990 | 13,595 | +0.77% |
| 1995 | 15,010 | +1.87% |
| 2000 | 20,332 | +6.72% |
| 2007 | 21,183 | +0.57% |
| 2010 | 25,538 | +7.04% |
| 2015 | 30,302 | +3.31% |
| 2020 | 39,322 | +5.64% |
| 2024 | 38,564 | −0.47% |
Source: Philippine Statistics Authority

In the 2024 census, the population of Damulog, Bukidnon, was 38,564 people, with a density of 160 inhabitants per square kilometre or 410 inhabitants per square mile.

== Economy ==
Poverty incidence of Damulog (%)

Source: Philippine Statistics Authority

== Infrastructure ==
=== Transportation ===
Damulog is accessible by land transportation. The existing land transportation in the city consists of multicabs from nearby towns, single motorcycles, buses from Cagayan de Oro and General Santos, tricycles, and private vehicles facilitate the movement of people and goods to and from all places in the town. Traveling from the Poblacion is mainly by land through all kinds of vehicles.

Damulog is traversed by Sayre Highway. This is from barangay Sampagar in the north to Old Damulog, Poblacion, Pocopoco, Macapari to Omonay in the south. There is concrete road from Poblacion to Kinapat, then all-weather road from Kinapat to Kiraon, then again concrete from Kiraon to Old Damulog forming a complete loop with the Sayre Highway. Another loop is the Sayre Highway in Pocopoco to Kinapat to Poblacion. The third loop is the Poblacion to Doncilyon to Old Damulog.

Most of these roads were built with grants from Asian Development Bank under the ARC Program. The Poblacion to Kinapat concrete road is also a part of the program.

Barangays Old Damulog and Macapari has covered courts. All 17 barangays have their respective office building, health center, Barangay Tanod outpost and complete school buildings.

=== Utilities ===
All barangays enjoy electricity supplied by the First Bukidnon Electric Cooperative (FIBECO). All barangays have either Level 2 or Level 3 water system. To focus on other development concerns, the local government created the Damulog Water System, part of a 2013 grant from the SALINTUBIG program of the Department of Health. Before this, the system supplied running water for only 2 hours every 2 days, and could not reach households away from the transmission line. The new system now provides 24-hour service managed by the water district.

=== Communication ===
Mobile services are primarily offered by Smart Communications, Globe Telecom, and Sun Cellular. Internet services are also offered by Sun Cellular, Smart Communications, and Globe Telecom in 3G and LTE or 4G technology.

== Education ==
All barangays have complete elementary schools. Day Care centers are also present in barangays and sitios where there is considerable number of children. Secondary schools include Damulog National High School, Macapari National High School, the private Xavier de Damulog High School and Kitingting Laguna Academy.

Within Damulog and its periphery, the South Korea-based Join Together Society built 34 school buildings with two classrooms each. This is part of peace-building efforts of the local government, promoting co-existence among Lumad, Muslims and Christians.
