= Puntian =

Puntian may refer to:

- An inhabitant of the Land of Punt
- An inhabitant of Puntland
- An administrative division in Quezon
