= Romy Tiongco =

Filipino politician

Romy P. Tiongco is a former Catholic priest and Christian Aid worker from the Philippines. During the 1970s he was a critic of the regime of Ferdinand Marcos. He later moved to the UK working in the NGO sector. He was Christian Aid North West regional co-ordinator. Together with his wife, Linda, he runs a UK registered charity MuCAARD which aims to bring Muslims and Christians together to tackle issues related to deforestation and sustainable forestry. In 2007 he stood for and won election as mayor of Damulog in the Philippines, winning re-election in 2010 and 2013.

In 2015 Tiongco was awarded the Fr William F Masterson SJ Award by Xavier University (Philippines) for service to the community - in particular for his role in bringing "peace and order" Damulog.

The Asian Institute of Management appointed him as a fellow of the Mindanao Bridging Leaders Program and the there is a long section (pp.44-52) of their report detailing his biography.

== Publications ==
- White, Sarah C. and Tiongco, Romy (1997) Doing Theology and Development: Meeting the Challenge of Poverty, Edinburgh: Saint Andrew Press (ISBN 0861532333 ISBN 978-0-86153-233-9)
- Tiongco, Romy, Myrna Bajo, Kate Fenn-Tye, and Action of Churches (2004). Voices from the South : A Five Week Study Guide for Christian Groups. Dunblane, London: ACTS : CTBI.
