= Quezon, Bukidnon =

Municipality in Bukidnon, Philippines

Quezon Kiokong
- Municipality
- Municipality of Quezon
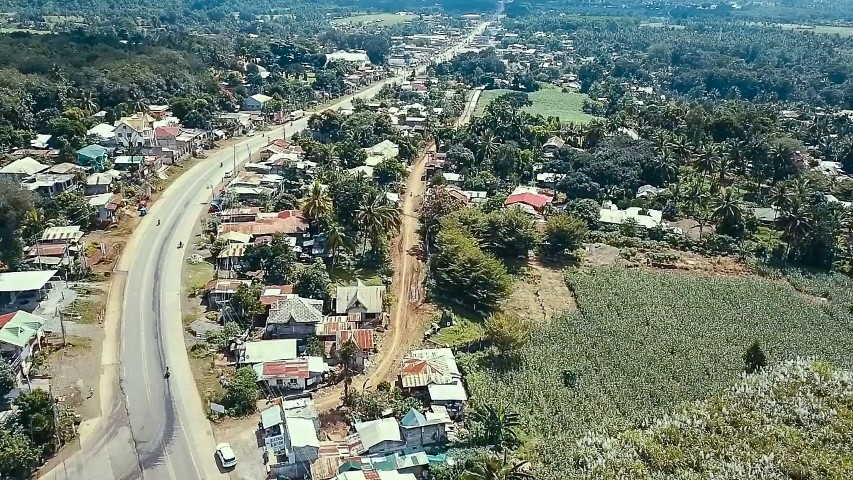
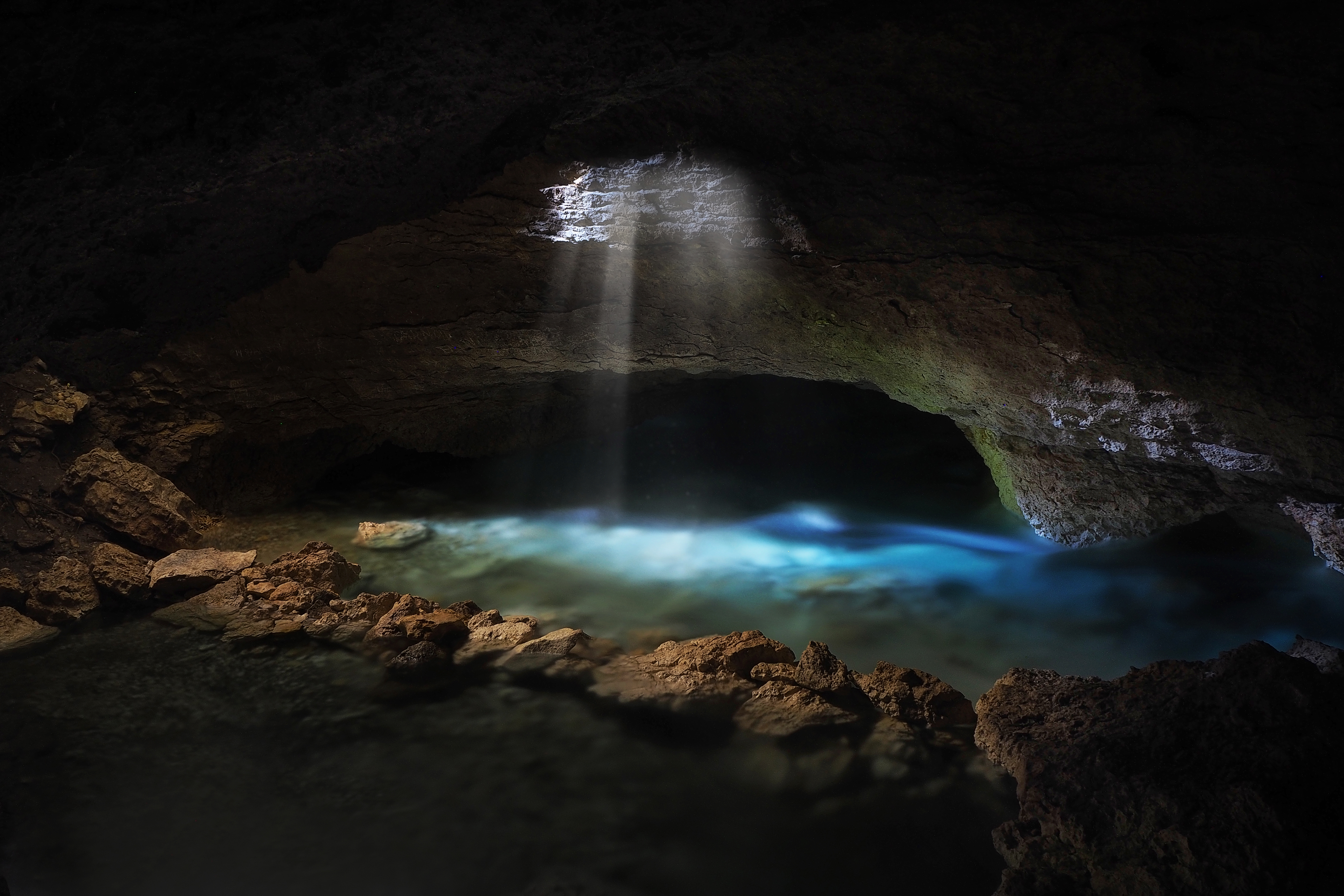
- Poblacion Kiokong White Rock Wall Blue Water Cave

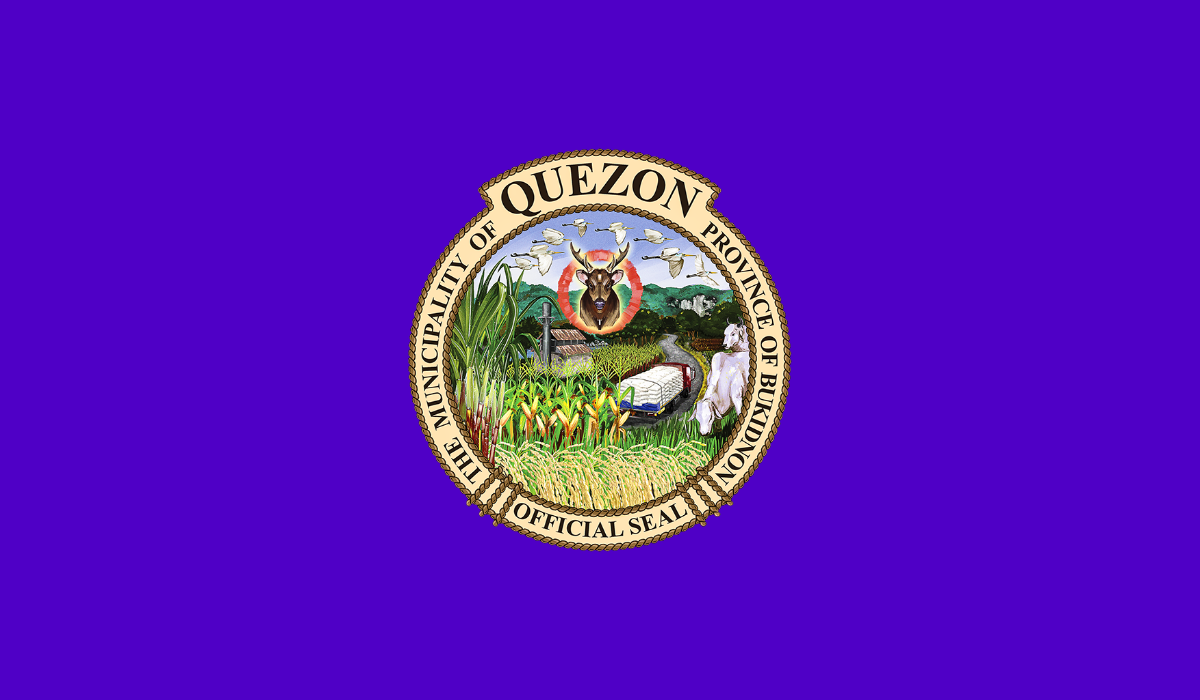
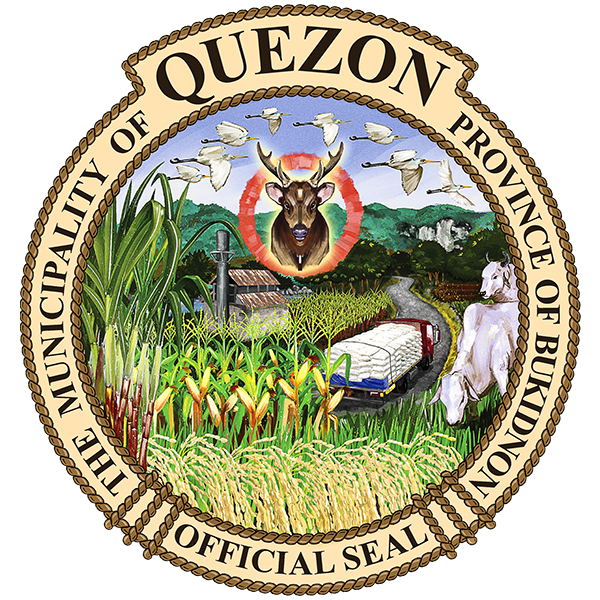
- Flag Seal
- Nickname: Sugar Capital of Bukidnon
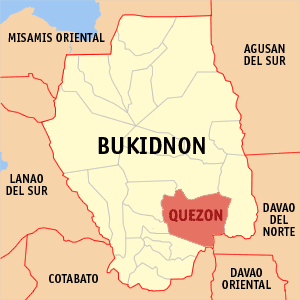
- Map of Bukidnon with Quezon highlighted
- Interactive map of Quezon
- Location within the Philippines
- Coordinates: 7°43′50″N 125°06′00″E
- Country: Philippines
- Region: Northern Mindanao
- Province: Bukidnon
- District: 3rd district
- Founded: June 18, 1966
- Named for: Manuel L. Quezon
- Barangays: 31 (see Barangays)

Government
  - Type: Sangguniang Bayan
  - Mayor: Pablo M. Lorenzo III
  - Vice Mayor: Joseph T. Durotan Sr.
  - Representative: Audrey Zubiri
  - Municipal Council: Members: Robert T. Gue; Jerly L. Areja; Restituto R. Baguio; Jose Miguel S. Fortich; Teresita B. Leonardo; Rodrigo N. Neri Jr.; Nilo P. Bardon; Myrna D. Repalda
  - Electorate: 69,719 voters (2025)

Area
  - Total: 626.86 km^{2} (242.03 sq mi)
- Elevation: 319 m (1,047 ft)
- Highest elevation: 629 m (2,064 ft)
- Lowest elevation: 222 m (728 ft)

Population (2024 census)
  - Total: 114,521
  - Density: 182.69/km^{2} (473.16/sq mi)
  - Households: 25,067

Economy
  - Income class: 1st municipal income class
  - Poverty incidence: 26.81% (2023)
  - Revenue: ₱ 625.8 million (2024)
  - Assets: ₱ 1,501 million (2024)
  - Expenditure: ₱ 608 million (2024)
  - Liabilities: ₱ 454.1 million (2024)

Service provider
  - Electricity: First Bukidnon Electric Cooperative (FIBECO)
- Time zone: UTC+8 (PST)
- ZIP code: 8715
- PSGC: 1001317000
- IDD : area code: +63 (0)88
- Native languages: Binukid; Cebuano; Ata Manobo; Tagalog
- Website: quezonbukidnon.gov.ph

Quezon, officially the Municipality of Quezon (Cebuano: Lungsod sa Quezon; Tagalog: Bayan ng Quezon), is a municipality in the province of Bukidnon, Philippines. According to the 2024 census, it has a population of 114,521 people.

== History ==
On June 18, 1966, Republic Act No. 4802 was enacted by the House of Congress under the sponsorship of the then Congressman Cesar M. Fortich, which act was entitled "An Act Creating The Municipality Of Quezon in The Province of Bukidnon," with the Seat of Government in the present site of Kiokong.

On June 21, 1969, Republic Act 5961 was passed by the Philippine Congress, amending Republic Act 4802 "An Act Creating the Municipality of Quezon in the Province of Bukidnon" with the seat of government at Salawagan. This act however, was not implemented, for on June 19, 1971, another Act - RA 6240 was passed transferring again the site from Salawagan to Kiokong.

== Geography ==
The municipality of Quezon is located at the southern portion of the province of Bukidnon. It is 55 kilometres (34 mi) from the City of Malaybalay, 149 kilometres (93 mi) from Cagayan de Oro (both via the BUSCO road, bypassing the municipality of Maramag) and 108 kilometres (67 mi) from Davao City. Quezon is bounded in the south by the municipality of Kitaotao; north by the city of Valencia; west by the municipality of Maramag and Don Carlos and east by the municipality of San Fernando.

The municipality of Quezon has a total land area of 71,128 ha (175,760 acres). It represents 6.78% of the total land area of the province of Bukidnon.

=== Barangays ===
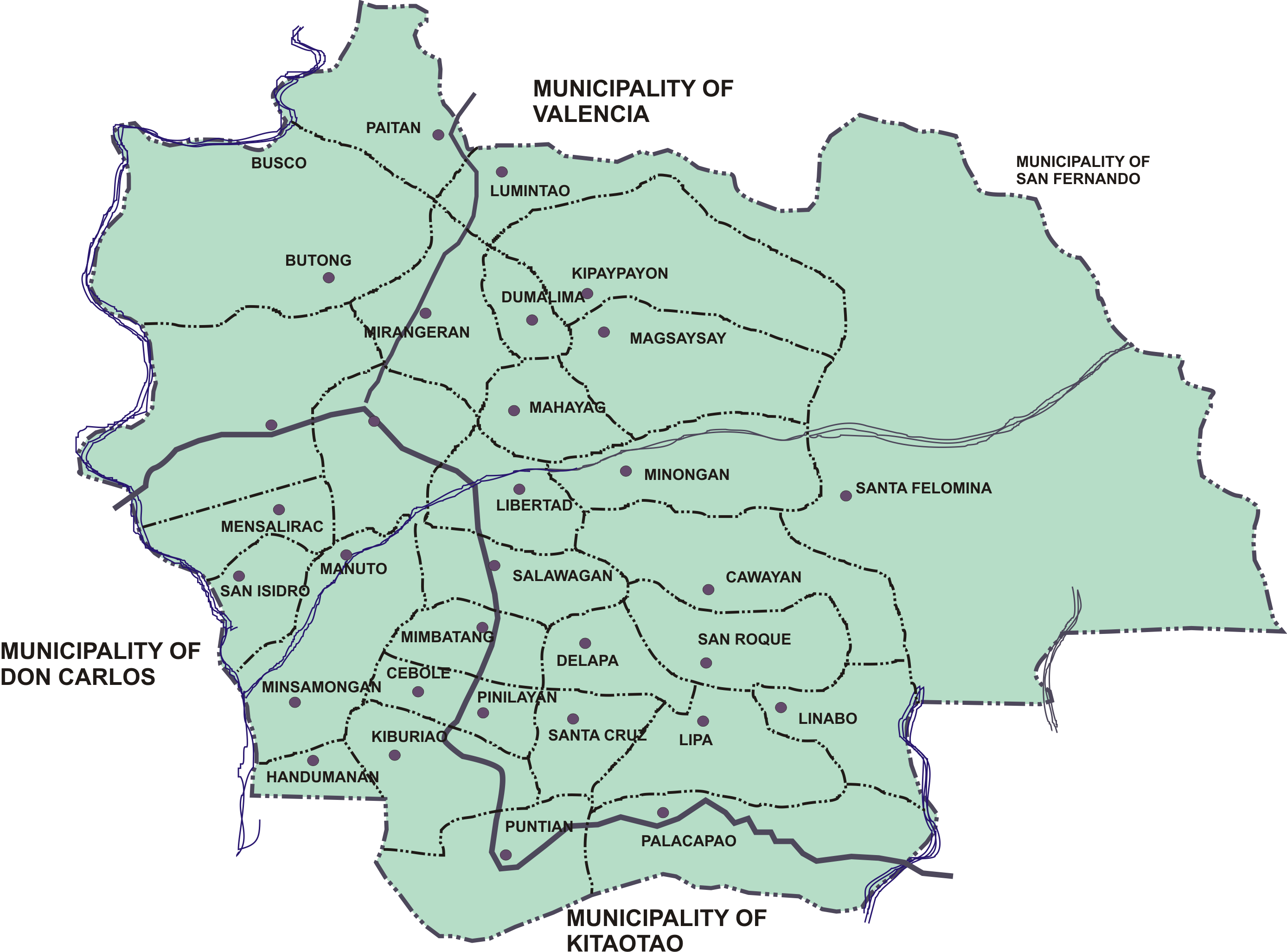
Political map of Quezon, showing its 31 barangays

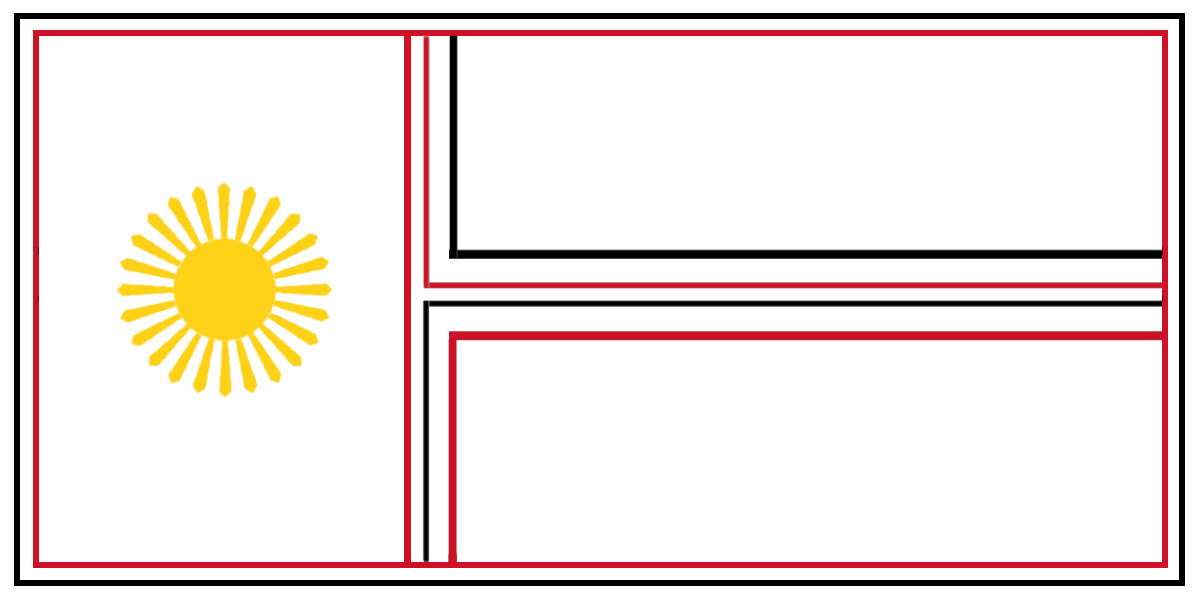
Former flag of Quezon, unknown date of use

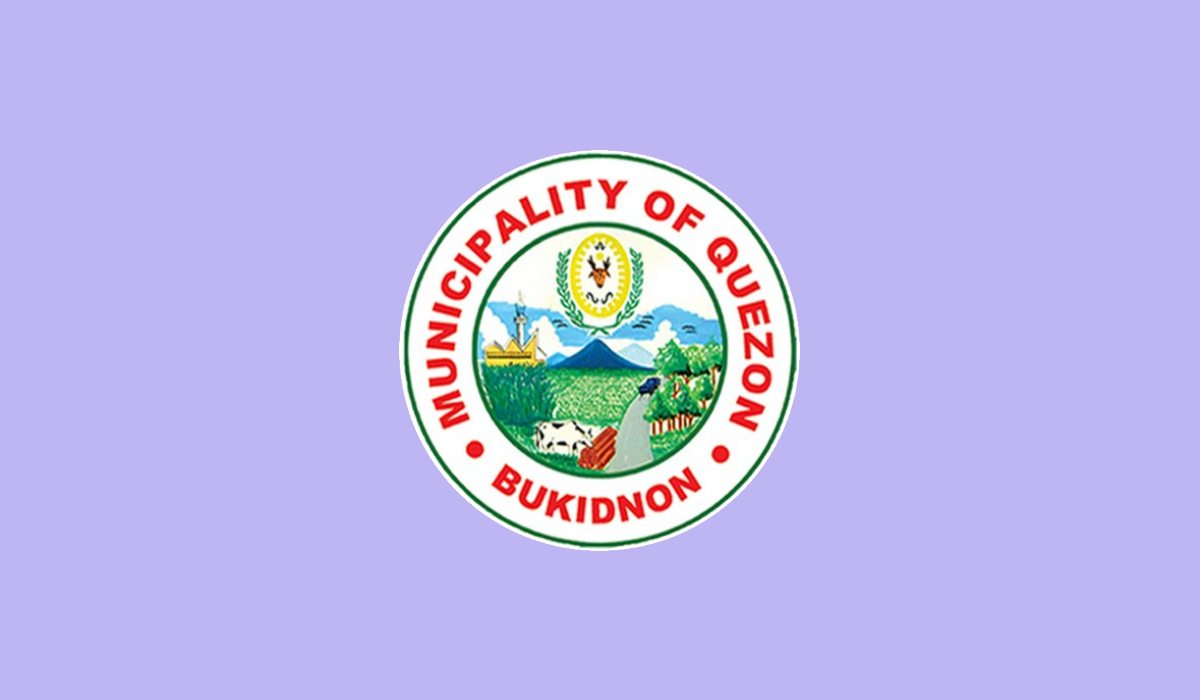
Former flag of Quezon until 2020

Former seal of Quezon until 2020

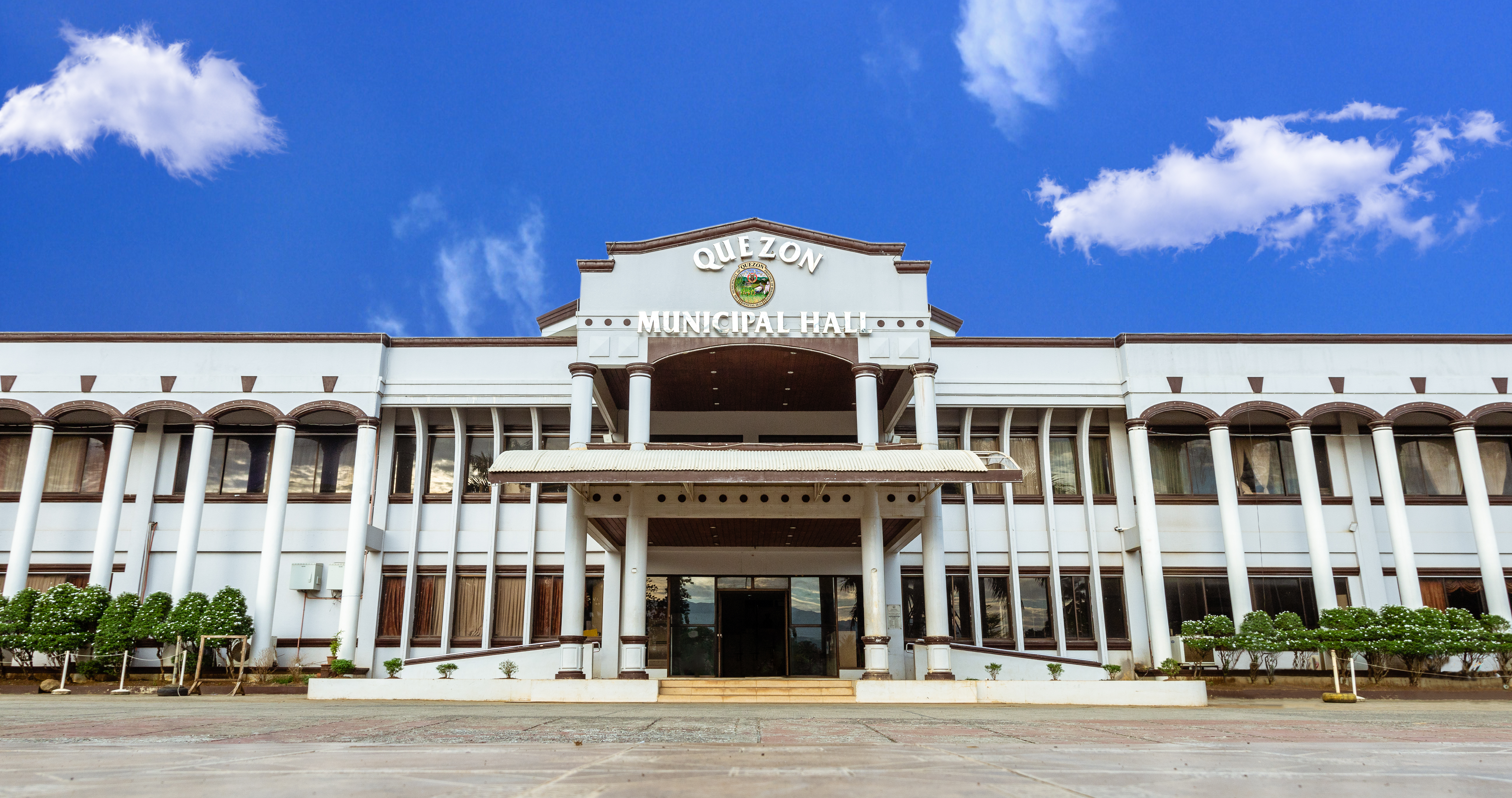
Quezon Municipal Hall

Quezon is politically subdivided into 31 barangays. Each barangay consists of puroks while some have sitios.

| PSGC | Barangay | Population | | | ±% p.a. | |
| | | 2024 | | 2010 | | |
|---|---|---|---|---|---|---|
| 101317001 | Butong | 11.6% | 13,258 | 12,455 | ▴ | 0.43% |
| 101317002 | Cebole | 1.5% | 1,749 | 1,386 | ▴ | 1.61% |
| 101317003 | Delapa | 2.8% | 3,191 | 2,904 | ▴ | 0.65% |
| 101317004 | Dumalama | 0.8% | 925 | 974 | ▾ | −0.35% |
| 101317006 | C‑Handumanan | 0.9% | 1,002 | 893 | ▴ | 0.79% |
| 101317007 | Cawayan | 1.0% | 1,184 | 1,108 | ▴ | 0.46% |
| 101317008 | Kiburiao | 4.0% | 4,531 | 4,560 | ▾ | −0.04% |
| 101317009 | Kipaypayon | 1.5% | 1,726 | 1,308 | ▴ | 1.92% |
| 101317010 | Libertad | 2.9% | 3,371 | 2,725 | ▴ | 1.47% |
| 101317012 | Linabo | 1.6% | 1,860 | 1,845 | ▴ | 0.06% |
| 101317013 | Lipa | 1.0% | 1,158 | 1,106 | ▴ | 0.32% |
| 101317014 | Lumintao | 3.3% | 3,793 | 3,584 | ▴ | 0.39% |
| 101317016 | Magsaysay | 1.8% | 2,084 | 1,857 | ▴ | 0.80% |
| 101317017 | Mahayag | 1.4% | 1,594 | 1,352 | ▴ | 1.14% |
| 101317018 | Manuto | 2.1% | 2,371 | 2,271 | ▴ | 0.30% |
| 101317019 | Merangeran | 3.6% | 4,102 | 3,902 | ▴ | 0.34% |
| 101317020 | Mibantang | 2.2% | 2,475 | 2,178 | ▴ | 0.88% |
| 101317021 | Minongan | 1.7% | 1,985 | 1,822 | ▴ | 0.59% |
| 101317022 | Minsamongan | 0.9% | 1,069 | 804 | ▴ | 1.98% |
| 101317025 | Paitan | 3.6% | 4,177 | 4,050 | ▴ | 0.21% |
| 101317026 | Palacapao | 2.5% | 2,899 | 2,982 | ▾ | −0.19% |
| 101317027 | Pinilayan | 1.0% | 1,110 | 987 | ▴ | 0.81% |
| 101317028 | Poblacion | 13.3% | 15,247 | 13,284 | ▴ | 0.95% |
| 101317029 | Puntian | 2.3% | 2,653 | 2,542 | ▴ | 0.29% |
| 101317030 | Salawagan | 6.9% | 7,945 | 7,105 | ▴ | 0.77% |
| 101317031 | San Isidro | 0.7% | 810 | 779 | ▴ | 0.27% |
| 101317032 | San Jose | 6.7% | 7,691 | 6,881 | ▴ | 0.77% |
| 101317033 | San Roque | 1.4% | 1,658 | 1,370 | ▴ | 1.32% |
| 101317034 | Sta. Cruz | 2.1% | 2,442 | 2,159 | ▴ | 0.85% |
| 101317035 | Santa Filomena | 2.2% | 2,481 | 1,947 | ▴ | 1.68% |
| 101317036 | Minsalirac | 1.4% | 1,575 | 1,464 | ▴ | 0.50% |
| | Total | | 114,521 | 94,584 | ▴ | 1.32% |

=== Drainage/water systems ===
The biggest body of water found in the municipality is the Pulangui River. This is one of the exit paths of drainage systems in urban areas to prevent stagnation of waters during heavy rain.

Boxed Culverts, ripraps and other structures are constructed over and around river crossings in so that the people can safely traverse places around bodies of water and communities are kept safe from flashfloods even when the river levels rise due to natural weather phenomena. These solutions contribute to a fairly dry and safe municipality.

=== Climate ===
The Philippine Atmospheric Geographical and Astronomical Service Administration (PAGASA) classified the climate of Quezon into the category of the first type. The dry and wet seasons are pronounced throughout the year. The warmest months are February, March and April. The rainy months are June, July, August and September. It is in the month of January that Quezon populace experience the coldest nights.

Climate data for Quezon, Bukidnon
| Month | Jan | Feb | Mar | Apr | May | Jun | Jul | Aug | Sep | Oct | Nov | Dec | Year |
|---|---|---|---|---|---|---|---|---|---|---|---|---|---|
| Mean daily maximum °C (°F) | 29 (84) | 29 (84) | 30 (86) | 31 (88) | 30 (86) | 29 (84) | 29 (84) | 29 (84) | 30 (86) | 29 (84) | 29 (84) | 29 (84) | 29 (85) |
| Mean daily minimum °C (°F) | 20 (68) | 20 (68) | 20 (68) | 21 (70) | 22 (72) | 23 (73) | 22 (72) | 22 (72) | 22 (72) | 22 (72) | 22 (72) | 21 (70) | 21 (71) |
| Average precipitation mm (inches) | 44 (1.7) | 27 (1.1) | 32 (1.3) | 35 (1.4) | 76 (3.0) | 117 (4.6) | 108 (4.3) | 108 (4.3) | 94 (3.7) | 100 (3.9) | 76 (3.0) | 46 (1.8) | 863 (34.1) |
| Average rainy days | 10.3 | 8.1 | 8.5 | 9.6 | 21.0 | 24.9 | 25.0 | 24.2 | 22.5 | 23.4 | 17.7 | 11.4 | 206.6 |
Source: Meteoblue

== Demographics ==
Population census of Quezon
| Year | Pop. | ±% p.a. |
|---|---|---|
| 1970 | 38,084 | — |
| 1975 | 52,324 | +6.58% |
| 1980 | 59,819 | +2.71% |
| 1990 | 70,566 | +1.67% |
| 1995 | 74,141 | +0.93% |
| 2000 | 82,567 | +2.33% |
| 2007 | 91,119 | +1.37% |
| 2010 | 94,584 | +1.37% |
| 2015 | 104,116 | +1.85% |
| 2020 | 109,624 | +1.09% |
| 2024 | 114,521 | +1.05% |
Source: Philippine Statistics Authority

=== Population by mother tongue ===
- Tagalog: 471
- Binukid: 69,008
- Hiligaynon/Ilonggo: 6,498
- Ilocano: 1,338
- Pangasinan: 8
- Waray: 537
- Maranao: 1,050
- Tausog: 289
- Batak: 58
- Binisaya (other): 8
- Cebuano: 248
- Bilaan: 8
- Bukidnon (local): 124
- Butuanon: 58
- Inibaloi: 8
- Isinai: 8
- Manubo (Manobo): 735
- Masbateño: 8
- Surigaonon: 8
- Tboli (Tagaboli): 8
- English: 8
- Boholano: 100
- Other local dialects: 264
- Not stated: 817

== Economy ==
Poverty incidence of Quezon (%)

Source: Philippine Statistics Authority

Industries (and/or companies) presently operating in the municipality includes:

- BUSCO Sugar Milling Company
- BUSCO Refinery
- BUSCO Organic Fertilizer Processing
- Small scale grains processing
- Loom band factory
- Cattle raising
- Hog raising
- Poultry raising

=== Banking & finance ===
The municipality is served by multiple commercial banks, such as the Dumaguete City Development Bank in BUSCO, Butong, Mindanao Consolidated Cooperative Bank, First Valley Bank, Land Bank of the Philippines, BPI BanKO, and BDO-One Network Bank in Poblacion. These institutions offer deposit services and provide loans primarily to sugarcane growers and entrepreneurs.

== Tourism ==
The municipality has the following scenic spots that can attract and visited by the local and international tourist:

- The Lowan-lowan Spring Resort has an abundant flow of water that can be best enjoyed at any time. Located in the heart of the municipality.
- The Blue Water Cave, in the side of the mouth of Pulangi River.
- The Overview Nature and Culture Park, located in Palacapao, is one of the "must see" spot in the municipality. With an overlooking view that views all the land area of Quezon and its neighboring municipalities.
- The Kiokong White Rock Wall, the centerpiece of Kiokong Tourism Park, is the site of the first vertical bivouac adventure in the Philippines. With the assistance of a local outfitter, guests climb the 550-foot rock wall using Single Rope Technique until they reach a ledge 500 feet off the ground. After spending the night on the ledge, they abseil back to the ground.
- The Kiokong Tourism Park also has a bolted crag for sport climbing.
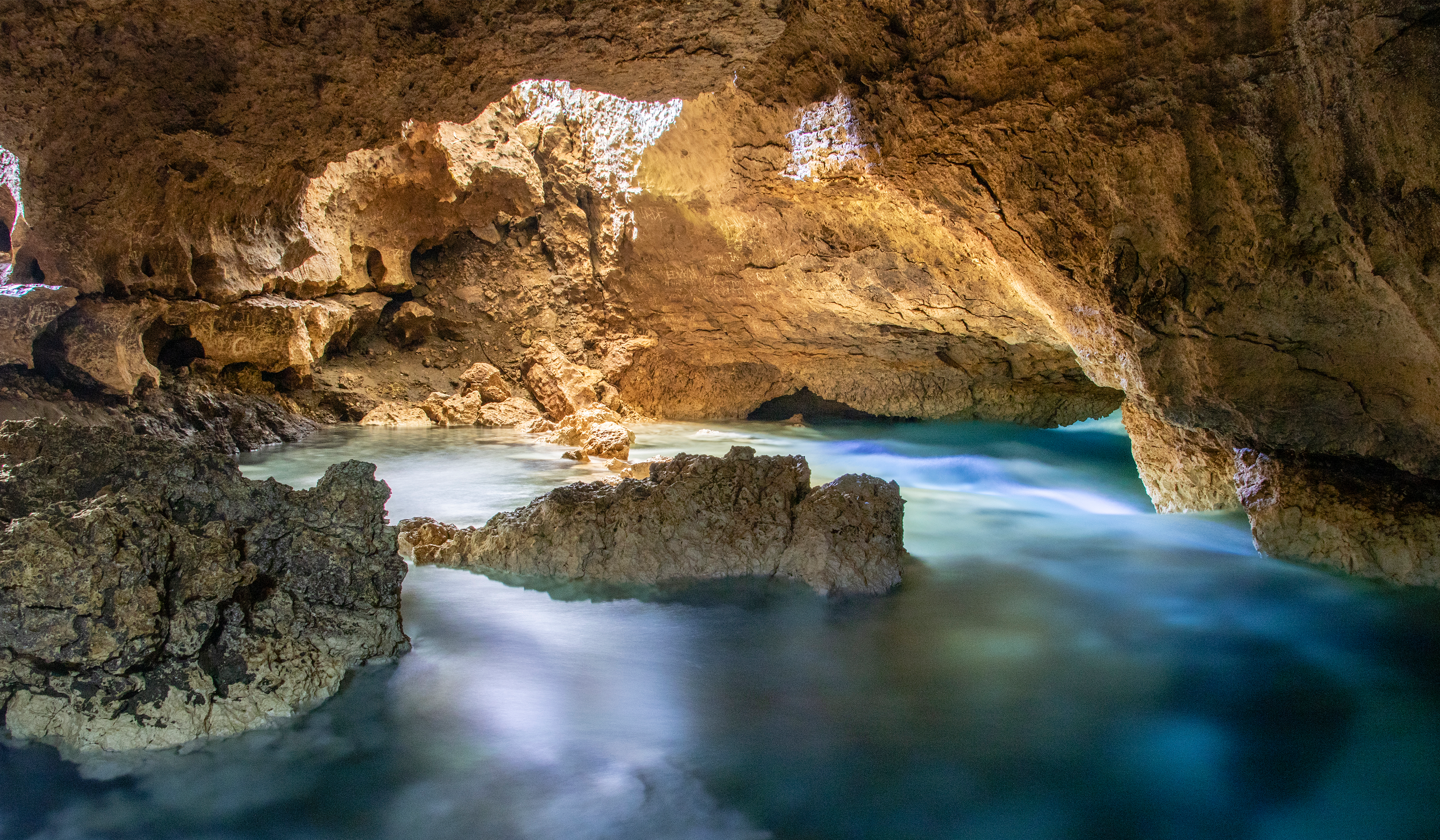
Blue Water Cave

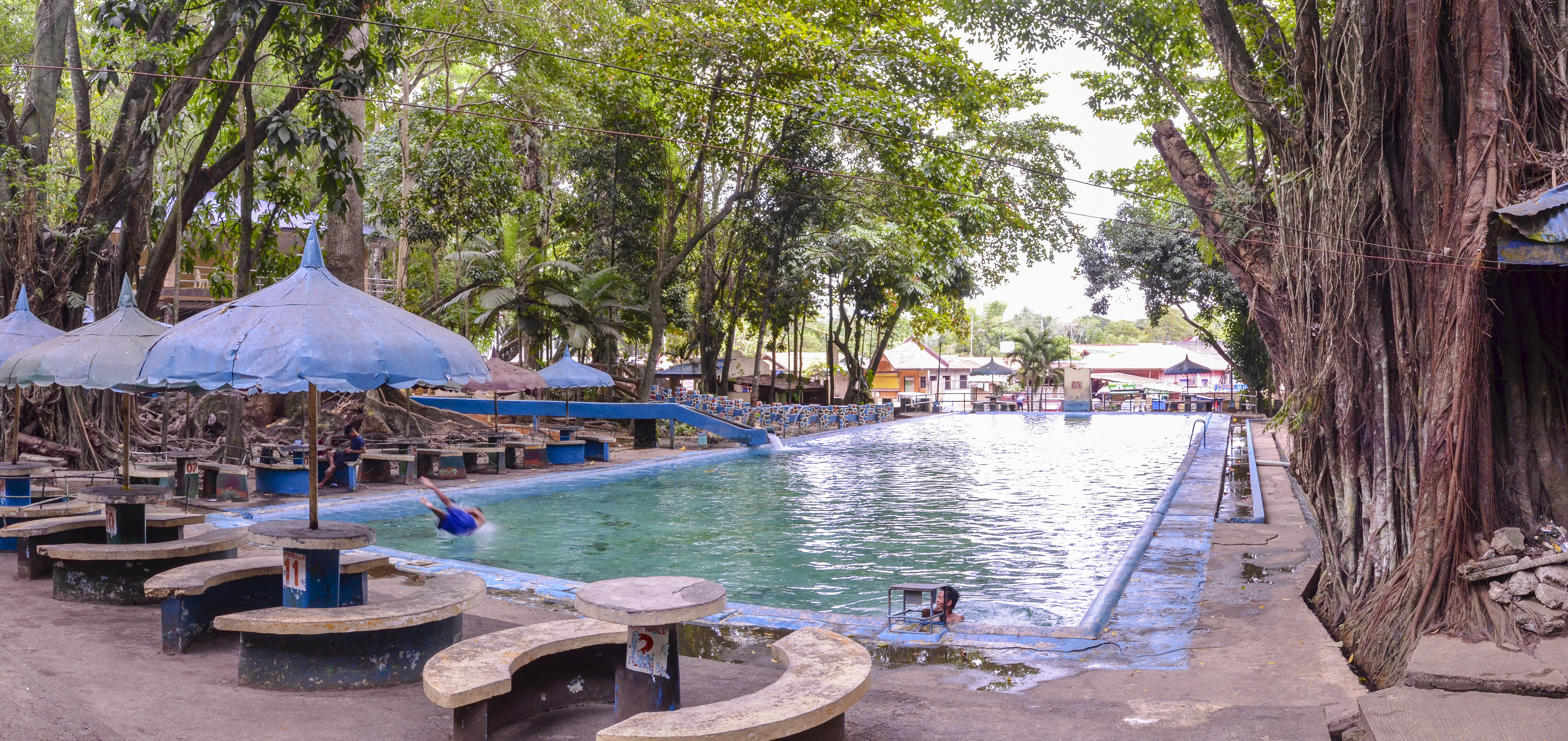
Lowan-lowan Spring Resort

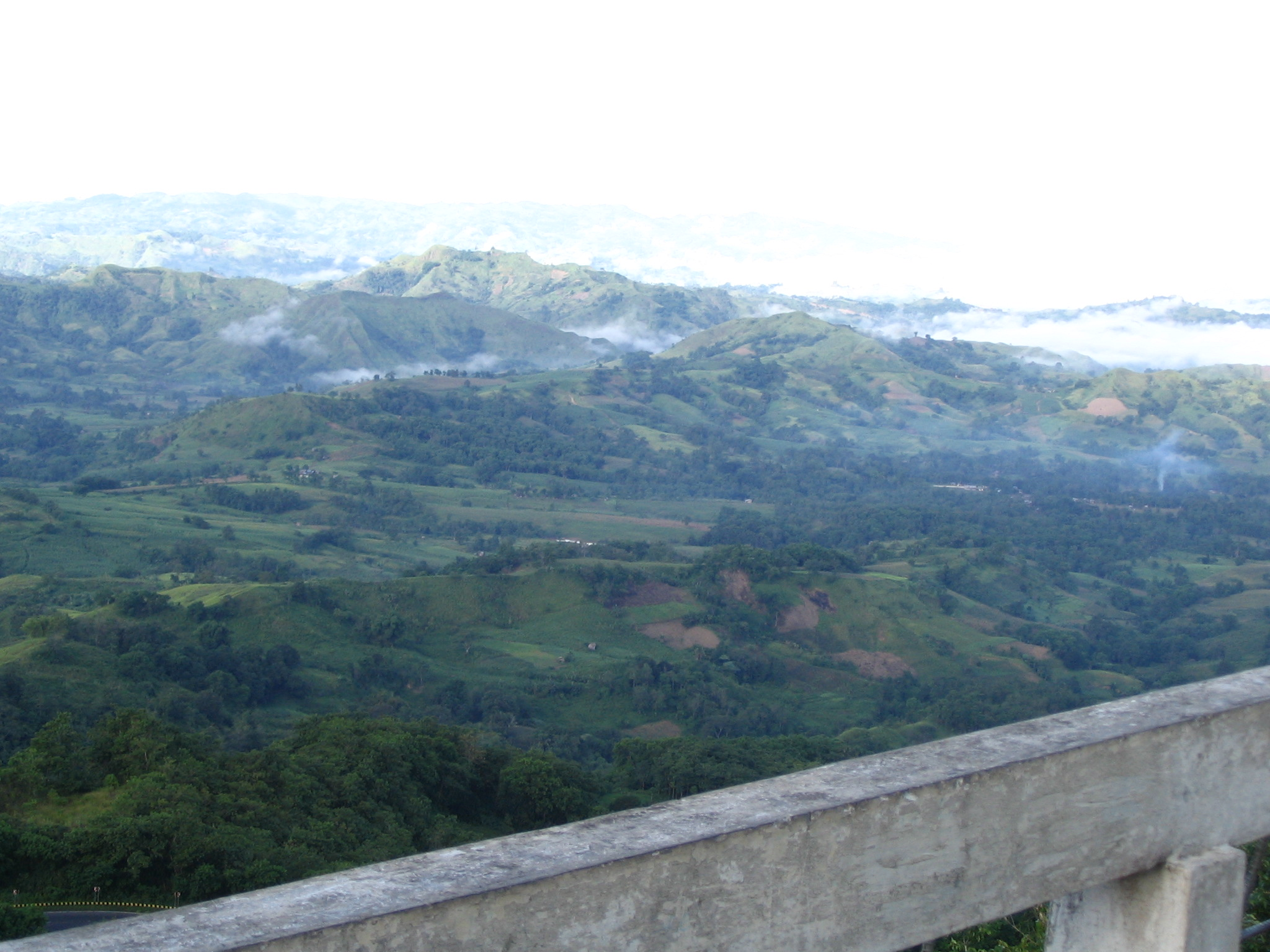
An overlooking view at a peak from a bridge in Quezon

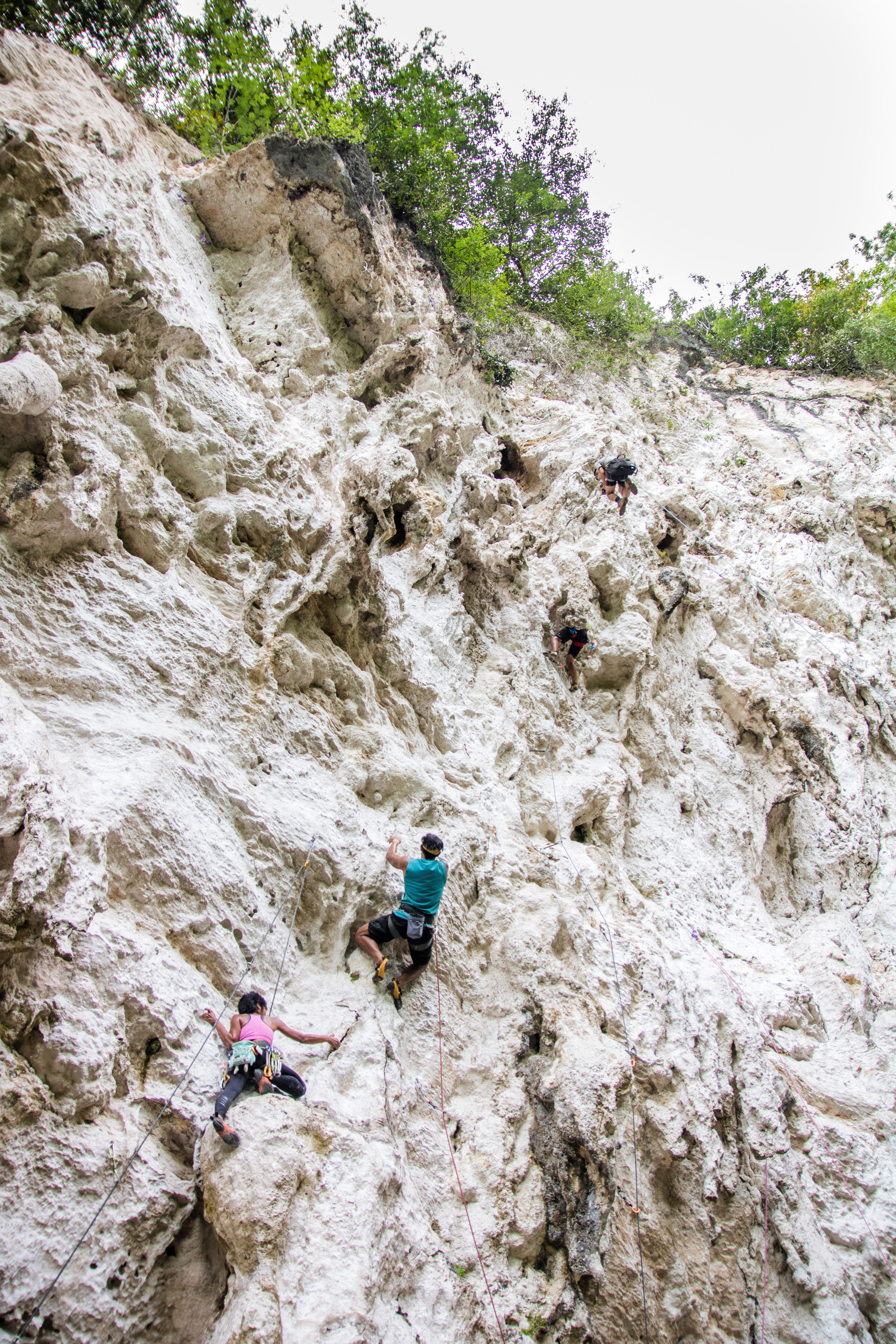
Kiokong White Rock Wall

== Infrastructure ==
=== Transportation ===
Quezon is a land-locked municipality where transportation is limited to land travel. It can be reached through two routes between Cagayan de Oro and Davao City: one via BUSCO and another via Maramag. The only bus company operating along this route is the Rural Transit of Mindanao, Inc., part of the Yanson Group of Bus Companies.

=== Utilities ===
Water supply

The waterworks system of the municipality was constructed and operated by the municipal government through the Municipal Mayor's Office - Economic Enterprise Division. It serves the barangay of Poblacion, Libertad, Salawagan, Mibantang, Cebole, Manuto, Pinilayan and Kiburiao with more or less 2,000 individual household connections (Level III). While the other barangays with tappable spring were also developed and have provided them potable water supply.

Power/electricity

Quezon has been under the service coverage of the First Bukidnon Electric Cooperative, Inc. (FIBECO, Inc.) since 1978. At present, all 31 barangays are energized, and the remaining unenergized areas receive power from generator sets supplied by the Local Government Unit.

Communication

There are five existing communication system linking the municipality to the parts of the country. These are the SOTELCO, PLDT, GLOBE, SMART and DOTC-Telof. Several fiber-optic internet service providers are also thriving in the Poblacion to cater the digital needs of the constituents and these are the GLOBE Telecom, PLDT, Converge ICT Solution and Haturiko Network and Data Solution.
