= Bukidnon's 3rd congressional district =

House of Representatives of the Philippines legislative district

- Constituency for the House of Representatives of the Philippines
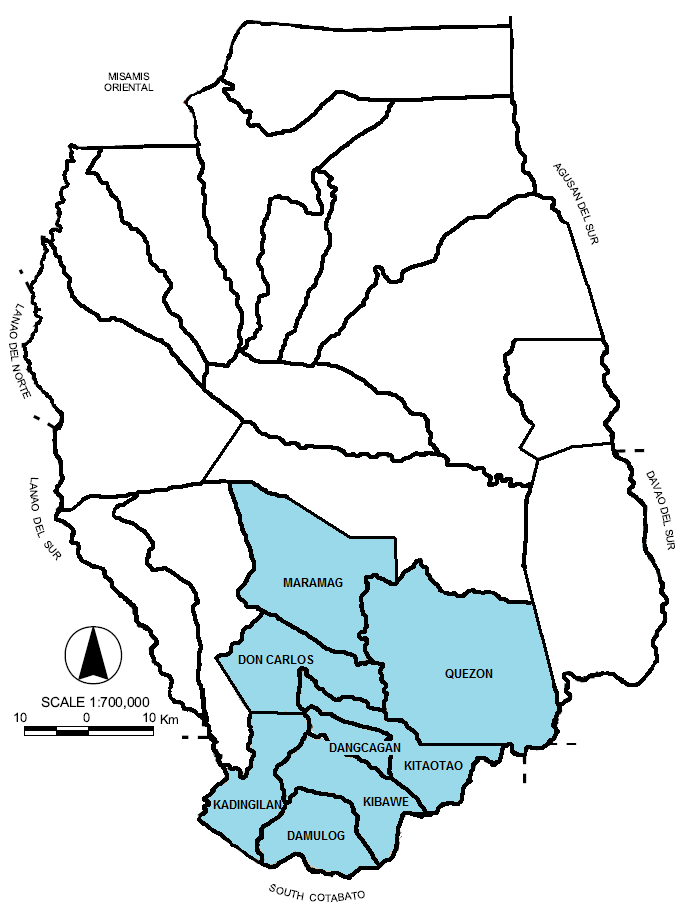
- Boundary of Bukidnon's 3rd congressional district in Bukidnon

- Location of Bukidnon within the Philippines
- Province: Bukidnon
- Region: Northern Mindanao
- Population: 482,016 (2020)
- Electorate: 301,841 (2022)
- Major settlements: 8 LGUs: Municipalities; Damulog; Dangcagan; Don Carlos; Kadingilan; Kibawe; Kitaotao; Maramag; Quezon
- Area: 3,219.57 km^{2} (1,243.08 sq mi)

Current constituency
- Created: 1987
- Representative: Audrey Zubiri
- Political party: BPP; PFP
- Congressional bloc: Minority

Bukidnon's 3rd congressional district is one of the four congressional districts of the Philippines in the province of Bukidnon. It has been represented in the House of Representatives since 1987. The district encompasses the entire southern frontier of Bukidnon bordering the Davao and Soccksargen regions. It consists of the municipalities of Damulog, Dangcagan, Don Carlos, Kadingilan, Kibawe, Kitaotao, Maramag and Quezon. It is currently represented in the 20th Congress by Audrey Zubiri of the Bukidnon Paglaum Party (BPP) and Partido Federal ng Pilipinas (PFP).

== Representation history ==
#	Image	Member	Term of office		Congress	Party	Electoral history	Constituent LGUs
#	Image	Member	Start	End	Congress	Party	Electoral history	Constituent LGUs
=== Bukidnon's 3rd district for the House of Representatives of the Philippines ===
District created February 2, 1987 from Bukidnon's at-large district.
1		Jose Maria R. Zubiri Jr.	June 30, 1987	June 30, 1998	8th	Liberal	Elected in 1987.	1987–present Damulog, Dangcagan, Don Carlos, Kadingilan, Kibawe, Kitaotao, Maramag, Quezon
1		Jose Maria R. Zubiri Jr.	June 30, 1987	June 30, 1998	9th	NPC	Re-elected in 1992.	1987–present Damulog, Dangcagan, Don Carlos, Kadingilan, Kibawe, Kitaotao, Maramag, Quezon
1		Jose Maria R. Zubiri Jr.	June 30, 1987	June 30, 1998	10th	Lakas	Re-elected in 1995.	1987–present Damulog, Dangcagan, Don Carlos, Kadingilan, Kibawe, Kitaotao, Maramag, Quezon
2		Migz Zubiri	June 30, 1998	June 30, 2007	11th	Lakas	Elected in 1998.	1987–present Damulog, Dangcagan, Don Carlos, Kadingilan, Kibawe, Kitaotao, Maramag, Quezon
2		Migz Zubiri	June 30, 1998	June 30, 2007	12th	Lakas	Re-elected in 2001.	1987–present Damulog, Dangcagan, Don Carlos, Kadingilan, Kibawe, Kitaotao, Maramag, Quezon
2		Migz Zubiri	June 30, 1998	June 30, 2007	13th	Lakas	Re-elected in 2004.	1987–present Damulog, Dangcagan, Don Carlos, Kadingilan, Kibawe, Kitaotao, Maramag, Quezon
3		Jose Maria F. Zubiri III	June 30, 2007	June 30, 2016	14th	Lakas	Elected in 2007.	1987–present Damulog, Dangcagan, Don Carlos, Kadingilan, Kibawe, Kitaotao, Maramag, Quezon
3		Jose Maria F. Zubiri III	June 30, 2007	June 30, 2016	15th	Lakas	Re-elected in 2010.	1987–present Damulog, Dangcagan, Don Carlos, Kadingilan, Kibawe, Kitaotao, Maramag, Quezon
3		Jose Maria F. Zubiri III	June 30, 2007	June 30, 2016	16th	Liberal (BPP)	Re-elected in 2013.	1987–present Damulog, Dangcagan, Don Carlos, Kadingilan, Kibawe, Kitaotao, Maramag, Quezon
4		Manuel F. Zubiri	June 30, 2016	June 30, 2022	17th	BPP	Elected in 2016.	1987–present Damulog, Dangcagan, Don Carlos, Kadingilan, Kibawe, Kitaotao, Maramag, Quezon
4		Manuel F. Zubiri	June 30, 2016	June 30, 2022	18th	BPP	Re-elected in 2019.	1987–present Damulog, Dangcagan, Don Carlos, Kadingilan, Kibawe, Kitaotao, Maramag, Quezon
(1)		Jose Maria R. Zubiri Jr.	June 30, 2022	June 30, 2025	19th	PFP (BPP)	Elected in 2022.	1987–present Damulog, Dangcagan, Don Carlos, Kadingilan, Kibawe, Kitaotao, Maramag, Quezon
5		Audrey Kay T. Zubiri	June 30, 2025	Incumbent	20th	PFP (BPP)	Elected in 2025.	1987–present Damulog, Dangcagan, Don Carlos, Kadingilan, Kibawe, Kitaotao, Maramag, Quezon

== Election results ==
=== 2025 ===
Candidate	Party	Votes	%
Audrey Zubiri	Partido Federal ng Pilipinas	225,970	93.88
Jay Areja	Aksyon Demokratiko	12,987	5.40
Jomer Valledor III	Independent	1,755	0.73
Total		240,712	100.00
Valid votes		240,712	90.77
Invalid/blank votes		24,464	9.23
Total votes		265,176	100.00
Registered voters/turnout		311,057	85.25
Partido Federal ng Pilipinas hold			
Source: Commission on Elections

=== 2022 ===
Candidate	Party	Votes	%
Jose Maria Zubiri Jr.	Bukidnon Paglaum	128,887	57.50
Arlyn Ayon	People's Reform Party	92,857	41.42
George Paña	Independent	1,024	0.46
Rey Cabaraban	Workers' and Peasants' Party	766	0.34
Alberto Ramilo	Partido Federal ng Pilipinas	632	0.28
Total		224,166	100.00
Total votes		254,258	–
Registered voters/turnout		301,841	84.24
Bukidnon Paglaum hold			
Source: Commission on Elections

== See also ==
- Legislative districts of Bukidnon
