= Kadingilan =

Municipality in Bukidnon, Philippines

- Municipality
- Municipality of Kadingilan
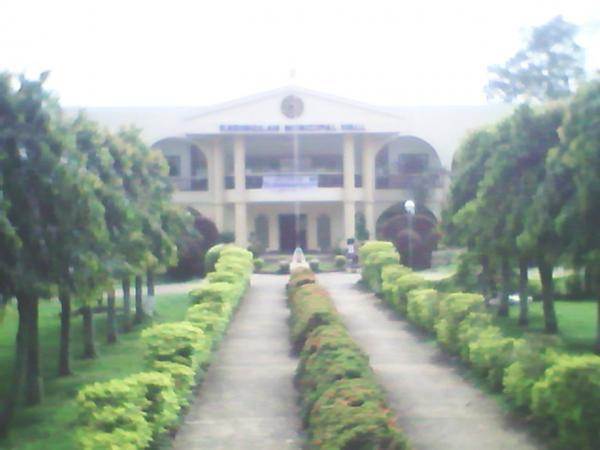
- Municipal hall

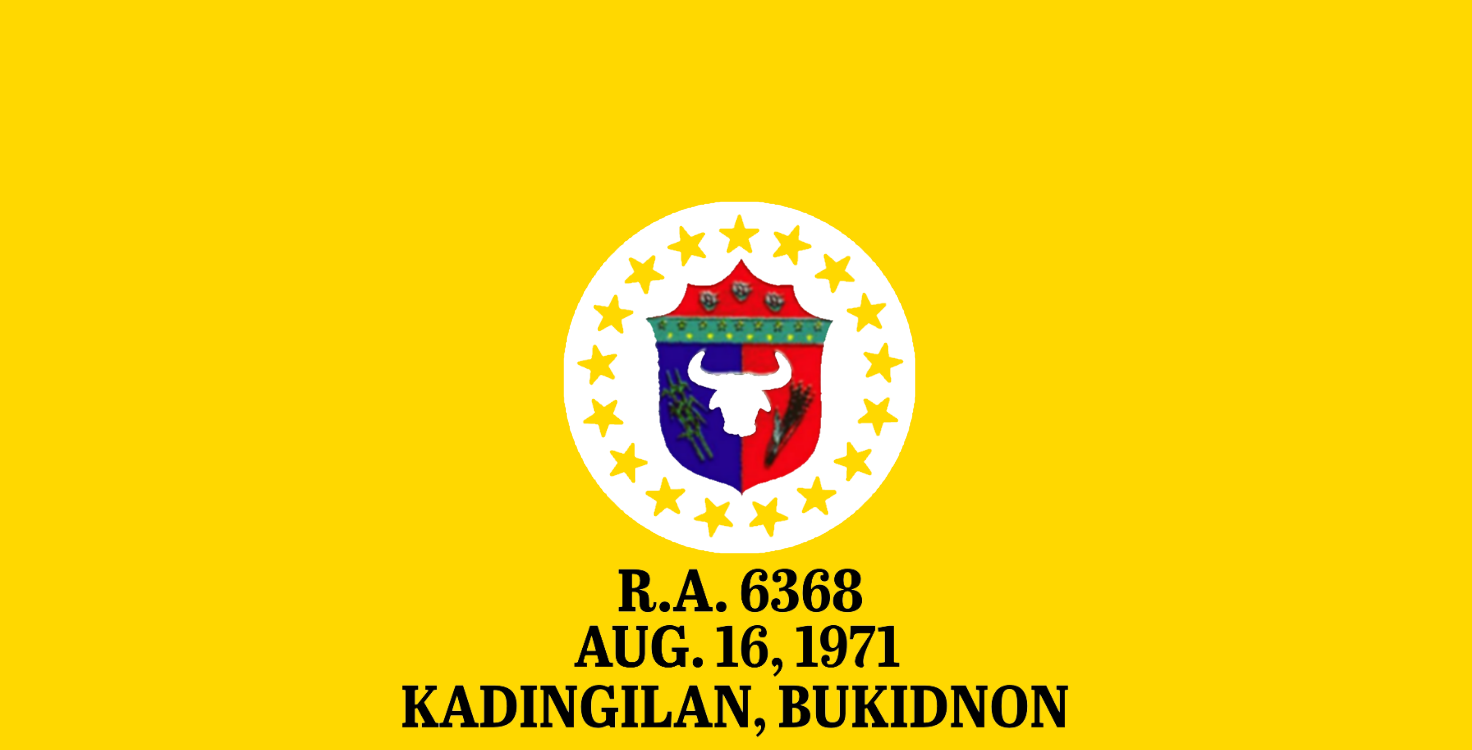
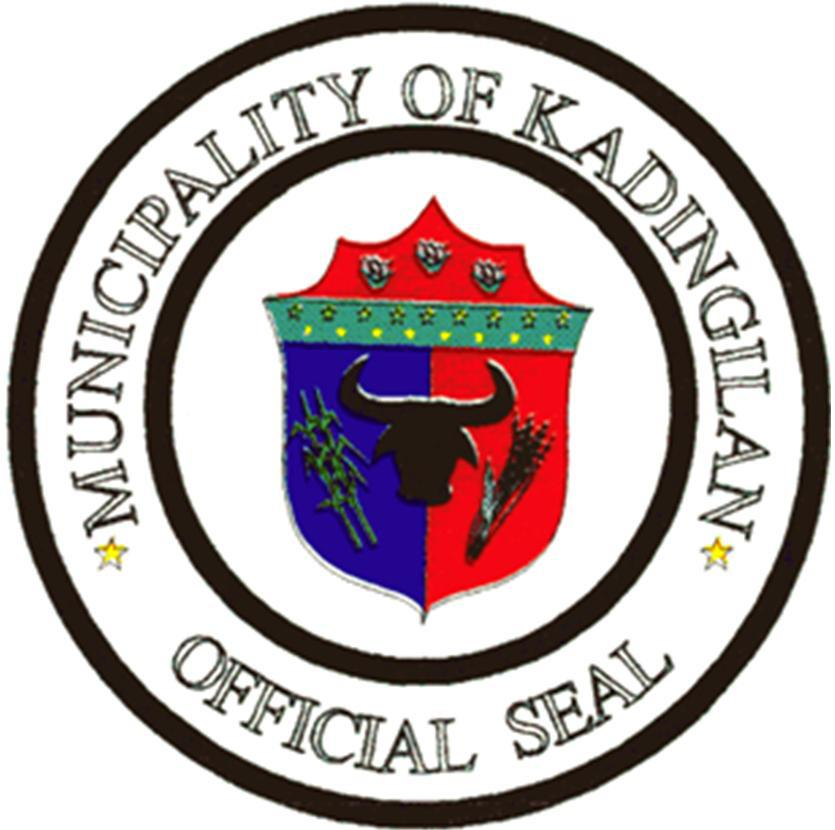
- Flag Seal
- Nickname: Green Haven of the South
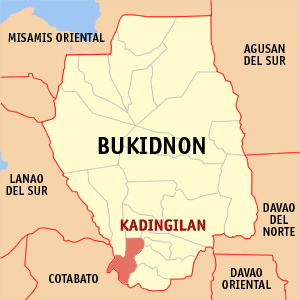
- Map of Bukidnon with Kadingilan highlighted
- Interactive map of Kadingilan
- Location within the Philippines
- Coordinates: 7°36′01″N 124°54′35″E
- Country: Philippines
- Region: Northern Mindanao
- Province: Bukidnon
- District: 3rd district
- Founded: August 16, 1971
- Barangays: 17 (see Barangays)

Government
  - Type: Sangguniang Bayan
  - Mayor: Jerry A. Canoy Jr.
  - Vice Mayor: Helbert A. Jovellar
  - Representative: Audrey Tan-Zubiri
  - Municipal Council: Members: Samuel H. Ramirez; Jerry A. Canoy Jr.; Julio D. Bag-ao; Magno O. Canoy Jr.; Emelita O. Tadeo; Marjurie E. Bullecer; Rolando R. Alambatin; Jean H. Lu
  - Electorate: 26,688 voters (2025)

Area
  - Total: 171.94 km^{2} (66.39 sq mi)
- Elevation: 302 m (991 ft)
- Highest elevation: 467 m (1,532 ft)
- Lowest elevation: 157 m (515 ft)

Population (2024 census)
  - Total: 35,432
  - Density: 206.07/km^{2} (533.72/sq mi)
  - Households: 7,991

Economy
  - Income class: 2nd municipal income class
  - Poverty incidence: 30.61% (2023)
  - Revenue: ₱ 207.8 million (2024)
  - Assets: ₱ 561.4 million (2024)
  - Expenditure: ₱ 205.6 million (2024)
  - Liabilities: ₱ 216.5 million (2024)

Service provider
  - Electricity: First Bukidnon Electric Cooperative (FIBECO)
- Time zone: UTC+8 (PST)
- ZIP code: 8713
- PSGC: 1001306000
- IDD : area code: +63 (0)88
- Native languages: Binukid; Cebuano; Ata Manobo; Matigsalug; Ilianen; Tagalog
- Website: www.kadingilanbuk.gov.ph

Kadingilan, officially the Municipality of Kadingilan (Cebuano: Lungsod sa Kadingilan; Tagalog: Bayan ng Kadingilan), is a municipality in the province of Bukidnon, Philippines.

== History ==
=== Cultural history ===
During the earlier times, there was a certain ethnic group headed by its chieftain named Datu Mandaganasa. He was then looking for a place located between two rivers as the possible home for his tribe, Kampong. They found vast tracts of land located between the Iniawan and Pinalpalan Rivers and decided to make the place as their territorial domain. As time passed by, the place got its name, Kadingilan from the corrupted native words Kadiay (which means "ours") and Matingilan (which means "temporary").

The growth and development of Kadingilan began after World War II. Migrants from all over the country flocked into its fertile lands. The original occupants were slowly replaced by Cebuanos, Boholanos, Warays and Igorots/Ifugaos. The original inhabitants were eventually eased-out by the influx of incoming Dumagats (a general term used for Christians).

=== Political history ===
When Bukidnon was created as a separate province from Agusan del Norte, Kadingilan became a barrio of Maramag since 1945. It existed as such until Kibawe was created as a regular municipality on July 1, 1956. Kadingilan was then taken from Maramag and became one of the regular barrios of Kibawe.

On August 16, 1971, Kadingilan was created as a municipality of Bukidnon pursuant to Republic Act 6368.).

The first set of Municipal Officials who pioneered the development of Kadingilan were:

- Bernardino L. Mejorada - Mayor
- Epifanio Q. Ramirez - Vice Mayor
- Clemente H. Edullantes - Councilor
- Pedro T. Guiritan - Councilor
- Agapito Cornell - Councilor
- Rodulfo Quilaton - Councilor
- Melecio Grafil - Councilor
- Emelio Ibonia - Councilor
- Ireneo Corona - Councilor
- Ariston Ado - Councilor

== Geography ==
Kadingilan lies within grid coordinates from 7O 20’ 31” north longitude and from 124O 49’ to 125O 2’ east latitude. Kadingilan is located along the south-western border of the province of Bukidnon. It is bounded on the north by the municipality of Don Carlos; north-east by the municipality of Dancagan; east by the municipality of Kibawe; southeast by the municipality of Damulog and on the south and south-west by the province of North Cotabato and on the west by the province of Lanao del Sur and north-west by the municipality of Pangantucan.

=== Barangays ===
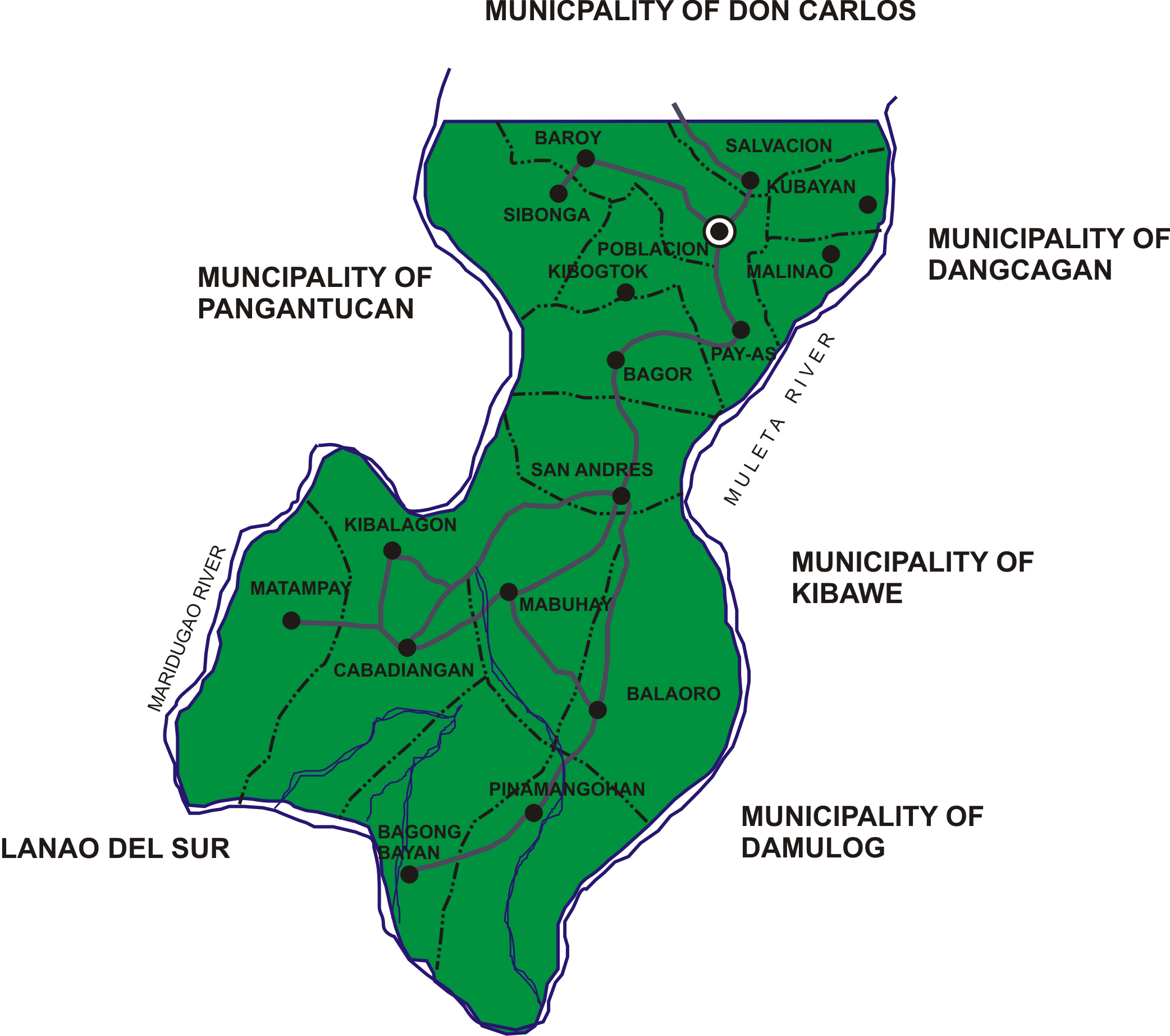
Political map of Kadingilan showing its 17 barangays

Kadingilan is politically subdivided into 17 barangays. Each barangay consists of puroks while some have sitios.

PSGC	Barangay	Population			±% p.a.	
		2024		2010		
101306001	Bagongbayan	4.4%	1,552	1,314	▴	1.16%
101306002	Bagor	5.3%	1,877	1,811	▴	0.25%
101306003	Balaoro	6.3%	2,247	2,185	▴	0.19%
101306004	Baroy	4.5%	1,583	1,510	▴	0.33%
101306005	Cabadiangan	13.1%	4,638	4,521	▴	0.18%
101306006	Husayan	1.7%	616	507	▴	1.36%
101306007	Kibalagon	3.1%	1,096	1,037	▴	0.39%
101306008	Mabuhay	2.3%	817	764	▴	0.47%
101306009	Malinao	3.3%	1,181	1,008	▴	1.11%
101306010	Matampay	3.4%	1,210	1,199	▴	0.06%
101306011	Sibonga	3.8%	1,332	1,286	▴	0.24%
101306012	Pay‑as	5.3%	1,892	1,863	▴	0.11%
101306013	Pinamanguhan	6.0%	2,115	1,663	▴	1.68%
101306014	Poblacion	18.0%	6,367	5,993	▴	0.42%
101306015	Salvacion	4.3%	1,526	1,465	▴	0.28%
101306016	San Andres	6.8%	2,408	2,270	▴	0.41%
101306017	Kibogtok	3.7%	1,321	1,360	▾	−0.20%
	Total		35,432	31,756	▴	0.76%

=== Topography ===
The topography of the municipality is characterized as rugged terrain with rolling, hilly and mountainous portions. These hills and mountains are dissected by rivers and creeks, such as the Muleta River on the eastern part which serves as the common natural boundary with the municipalities of Damulog, Dancagan and Kibawe. The Maridugao and Kidanggin Rivers at the southern portion separates Kadingilan from the municipality of Pangantucan and the province of Lanao del Sur.

=== Climate ===
The climate of the municipality belongs to type C agro-climatic zone. This zone is the most extensive and covers most of the present and potential agricultural area in the province. Relatively low rainfall is due to rain shadow effect of the mountainous belt on the eastern side of Bukidnon. Rainfall distribution is likely to vary in the southern part of the province because of the presence of adjoining hills and mountain ranges. The heaviest rainfall occurs during the months of May to September.

Climate data for Kadingilan, Bukidnon
Month	Jan	Feb	Mar	Apr	May	Jun	Jul	Aug	Sep	Oct	Nov	Dec	Year
Mean daily maximum °C (°F)	29 (84)	30 (86)	30 (86)	31 (88)	29 (84)	28 (82)	28 (82)	29 (84)	29 (84)	28 (82)	29 (84)	29 (84)	29 (84)
Mean daily minimum °C (°F)	22 (72)	22 (72)	22 (72)	23 (73)	24 (75)	23 (73)	23 (73)	23 (73)	23 (73)	23 (73)	23 (73)	22 (72)	23 (73)
Average precipitation mm (inches)	174 (6.9)	145 (5.7)	159 (6.3)	192 (7.6)	302 (11.9)	343 (13.5)	297 (11.7)	265 (10.4)	244 (9.6)	293 (11.5)	306 (12.0)	188 (7.4)	2,908 (114.5)
Average rainy days	17.4	14.4	17.4	21.3	27.6	28.0	27.9	26.9	25.0	26.9	26.0	21.1	279.9
Source: Meteoblue

=== Elevation ===
About fifty two percent of the total land area has an elevation of 300–400 meters above sea level while forty percent is between 0–30 m. asl. Only hundred fifty hectares are within the elevation of 500 meters and above and these are mostly found within the Payao and Matampay hills.

=== Slope ===
Twenty six percent of the total land area of the municipality has slope of 18-30% which is described as rolling to hilly. These are areas classified as timberland within the barangays of Cabadiangan and Mabuhay. Twenty-four percent has a slope category of 3-8%, characterized as sloping to undulating. Only about fifteen percent or a total of 2,628 hectares fall under the slope range of 0-3% (level to gently sloping covering more than thirty six percent of the total alienable and disposable lands.

=== Soil ===
The soil type of Kadingilan is predominantly Kidapawan clay. It is characterized as light brown to dark brown in color, hard when dry; plastic and sticky when moist and wet and has fair organic matter content.

=== Drainage/Hydrology ===
There are two type of drainage identified: internal and external. The former is mainly influenced by soil texture which is the removal of excess water within the soil profile. The latter is influenced by slope and physiographic position, refers to the removal of surface water. Usually when a soil is poorly drained externally, it is also poorly drained internally. Generally, all upland soils like the Kadingilan soils, on the account of their physiographic position are well drained internally and externally. The proposed Maridugao River Irrigation Project, is projected to irrigate 6,000 hectares of ricefields covering the barangays of Baroy, Poblacion, Sibonga, Kibogtok, Salvacion, Malinao, Husayan and portion of Pay-as.

=== Mineral Resources ===
The municipality has volcanic sedimentary and metamorphic rock origin. One identified rock type is limestone (cord/line limestone, N,Ls) characterized as light cream to cream in color, partly fragmental, calcareous formation including reef limestone, bio-clastic limestone and calcasenite. The other type is sandstone and shale (N1) which is light brown and gray in color, thick transgressive marine deposits, and largely massive sandstone layers imbedded with siltstone and shale strata.

== Demographics ==
Population census of Kadingilan
Year	Pop.	±% p.a.
1975	16,977	—
1980	20,634	+3.98%
1990	23,911	+1.49%
1995	26,093	+1.65%
2000	25,858	−0.19%
2007	30,135	+2.13%
2010	31,756	+1.93%
2015	33,778	+1.18%
2020	33,735	−0.03%
2024	35,432	+1.19%
Source: Philippine Statistics Authority

In the 2024 census, the population of Kadingilan was 35,432 people, with a density of 210 inhabitants per square kilometre or 540 inhabitants per square mile.

=== Population growth ===
The period from 1975 to 1980 had a population growth of 3.98%. However, the next 10 years registered a population growth on only 1.48% due to disturbances of peace and order which caused out-migration. The 1995 census showed a growth rate of 1.76 percent, slightly higher than the 1990 count. The 1995 data also showed that four barangays - Baroy, Matampay, Pinamangguan and San Andres - experienced a decrease in population. This was due to migration of people to urban areas in search of better opportunities.

=== Population density ===
The population density of Kadingilan stood at 147 person per square kilometer in the 1995 census of population. This manifested a slight increase of 8.16 percent over that of the 1990 count which was pegged at 135 persons per square kilometer. Like most other parts of the province, the Poblacion is the most densely populated barangay. The 1995 count revealed the population density of the Poblacion at 598 persons per square kilometer or roughly 6 persons for every hectare of land. Barangays Malinao and Kibalagon followed with a population density of nearly 3 persons per hectare. The most sparsely populated barangay on the other hand is Matampay with only about 86 persons per square kilometer or only about 1 person per one hectare of land.

=== Languages ===
The people living in the municipality of Kadingilan are of diverse ethnic origins. Despite the situation, the Cebuano language is still generally the main language spoken by nearly 83 percent of the population. Boholano - a language native to the island of Bohol is also spoken by about 8 percent of the total population. It can also be observed that Manobo - a language spoken by the lumads - is used by nearly 5 percent of Kadingilan's population as of the 1995 census.

=== Labor population ===
Projected labor Force was derived using the Labor Force Profile. Using the percentage share allocation it was derived that the household population 15 years old and over will be at about 19,395 constituting 57.24 percent of the total population. About 14,954 of these is estimated to be gainfully employed providing support to the unemployed population in the labor force which is estimated at 2,525. Further, the same population is also expected to provide the same support to the depended population and those which belong to the same age group (15 years and over) but are not in the labor force.

== Economy ==
Poverty incidence of Kadingilan (%)

Source: Philippine Statistics Authority

== Local government ==
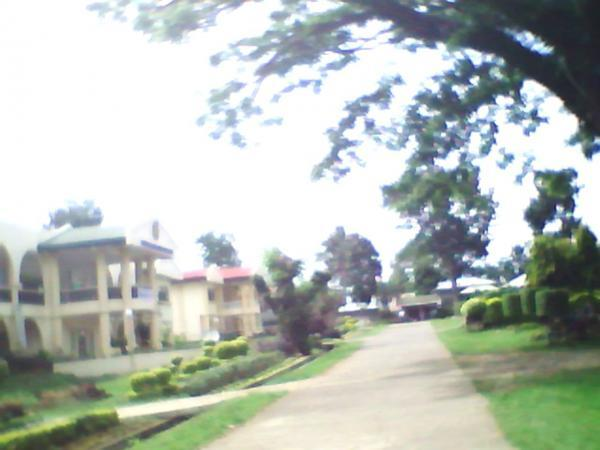
The Kadingilan town hallway

The local organization of the municipality is composed of 12 offices. Three of these offices were under the national government but are now devolved to the local government in adherence to the implementation of RA 7160. This law, otherwise known as the local government code of 1991 devolved to the local government the office of the Department of Health, Agriculture and the Social Welfare and Development.

In addition to the 12 offices, the municipal government also created the Economic Enterprise Division. This is especially for the purpose of generating funds for the local coffers through local efforts. This division had 3 important sections staffed by a total of 25 employees. The sections which have helped to augment generation of local financial resources are the Municipal Market and Slaughterhouse, Municipal Waterworks and Heavy Equipment Pool.

The organizational structure being followed by the municipality of Kadingilan is in adherence to the mandates as dictated by the Local Government Code of 1991.
