= Kibawe =

Municipality in Bukidnon, Philippines

- Municipality
- Municipality of Kibawe
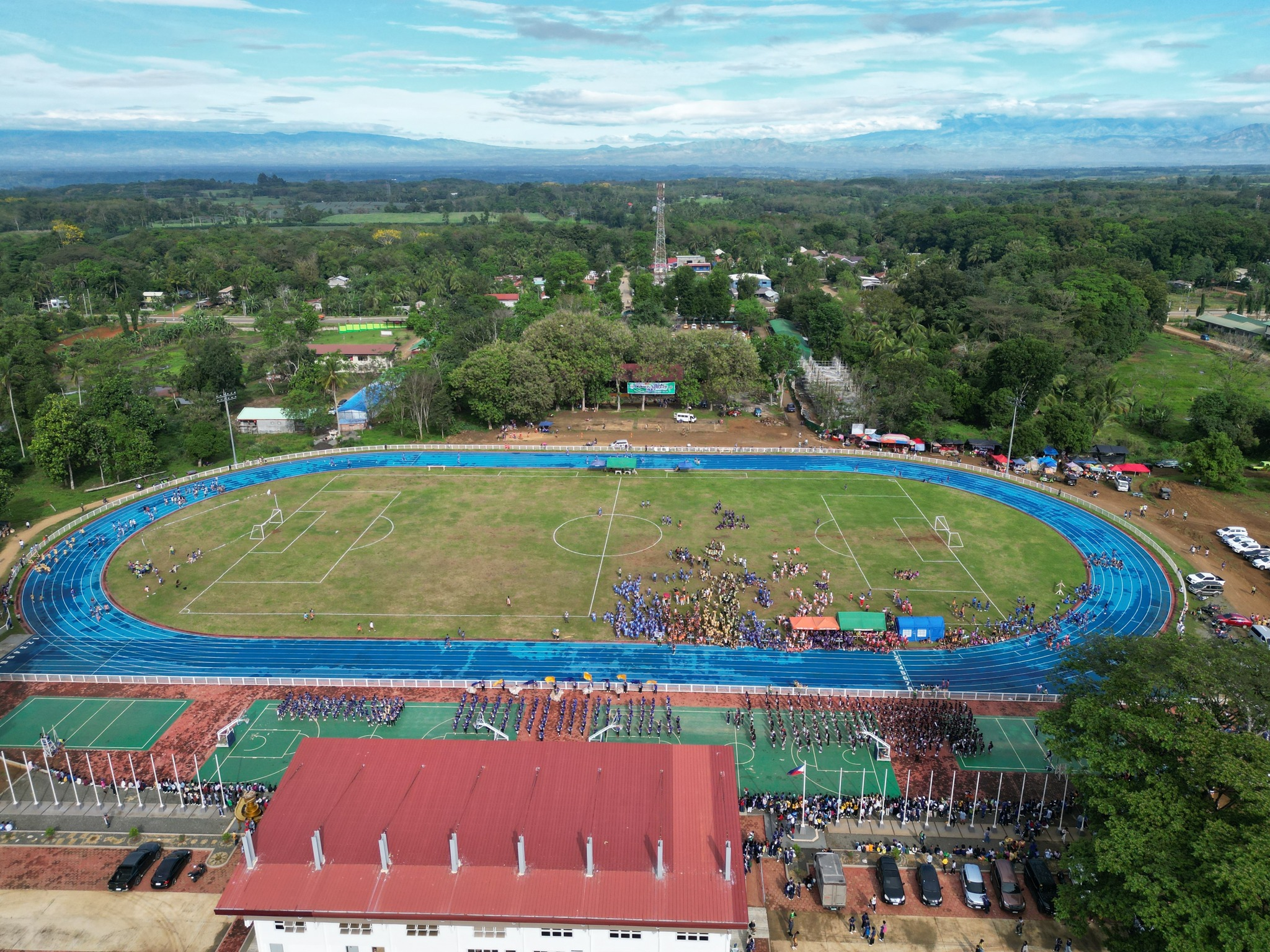
- Kibawe Sports Complex

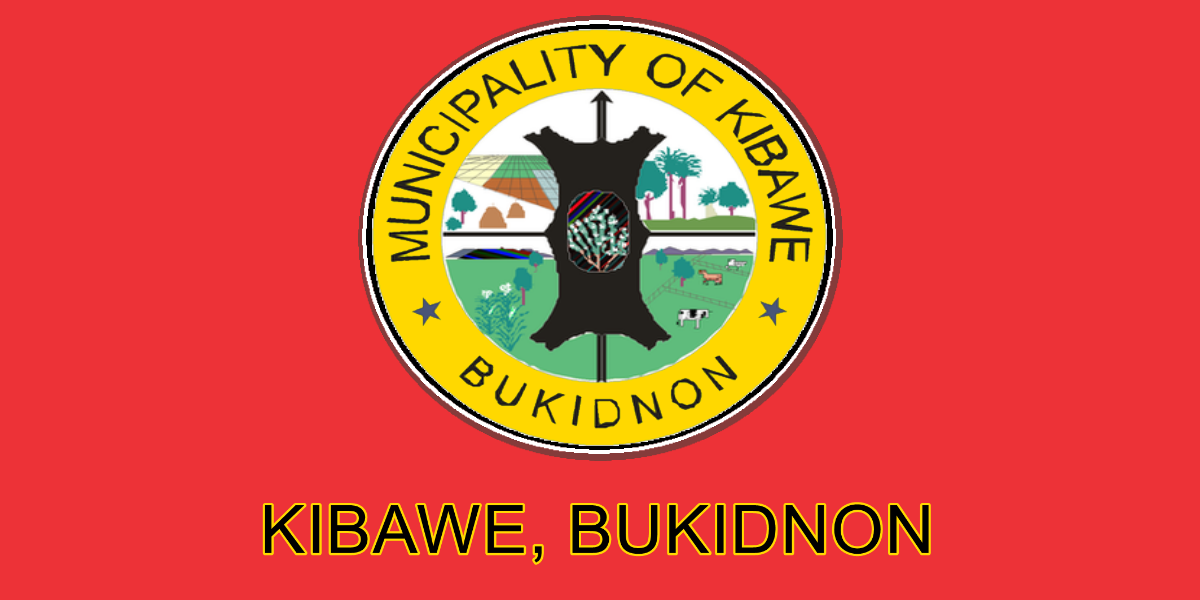
- Flag Seal

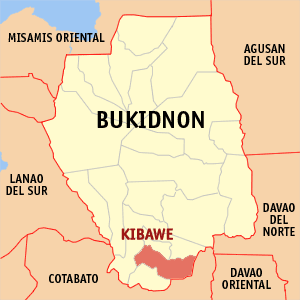
- Map of Bukidnon with Kibawe highlighted
- Interactive map of Kibawe
- Location within the Philippines
- Coordinates: 7°34′04″N 124°59′25″E
- Country: Philippines
- Region: Northern Mindanao
- Province: Bukidnon
- District: 3rd district
- Founded: July 1, 1956
- Barangays: 23 (see Barangays)

Government
  - Type: Sangguniang Bayan
  - Mayor: Reynaldo "Jimboy Tebontu" S. Ang Rabanes
  - Vice Mayor: Raymundo A. Batao Jr.
  - Representative: Audrey Zubiri
  - Municipal Council: Members: Risalito L. Panis; Arcadio L. Pitogo Jr.; Daniel P. Cabañelez; Gerardo H. Tan; Lauro C. Ranoco Jr.; Ronan R. Madelo; Jose M. Ganas; Luzviminda C. Tumongcay
  - Electorate: 28,321 voters (2025)

Area
  - Total: 304.13 km^{2} (117.43 sq mi)
- Elevation: 357 m (1,171 ft)
- Highest elevation: 504 m (1,654 ft)
- Lowest elevation: 186 m (610 ft)

Population (2024 census)
  - Total: 43,491
  - Density: 143.00/km^{2} (370.37/sq mi)
  - Households: 9,835

Economy
  - Income class: 1st municipal income class
  - 1st classPoverty incidence: 28.93% (2023)
  - Revenue: ₱ 272.3 million (2024)
  - Assets: ₱ 1,046 million (2024)
  - Expenditure: ₱ 237.1 million (2024)
  - Liabilities: ₱ 194.5 million (2024)

Service provider
  - Electricity: First Bukidnon Electric Cooperative (FIBECO)
- Time zone: UTC+8 (PST)
- ZIP code: 8720
- PSGC: 1001308000
- IDD : area code: +63 (0)88
- Native languages: Binukid; Cebuano; Ata Manobo; Matigsalug; Ilianen; Tagalog
- Website: www.kibawebuk.gov.ph

Kibawe, officially the Municipality of Kibawe (Cebuano: Lungsod sa Kibawe; Filipino: Bayan ng Kibawe), is a municipality in the province of Bukidnon, Philippines. According to the 2024 census, it has a population of 43,491 people.

== History ==
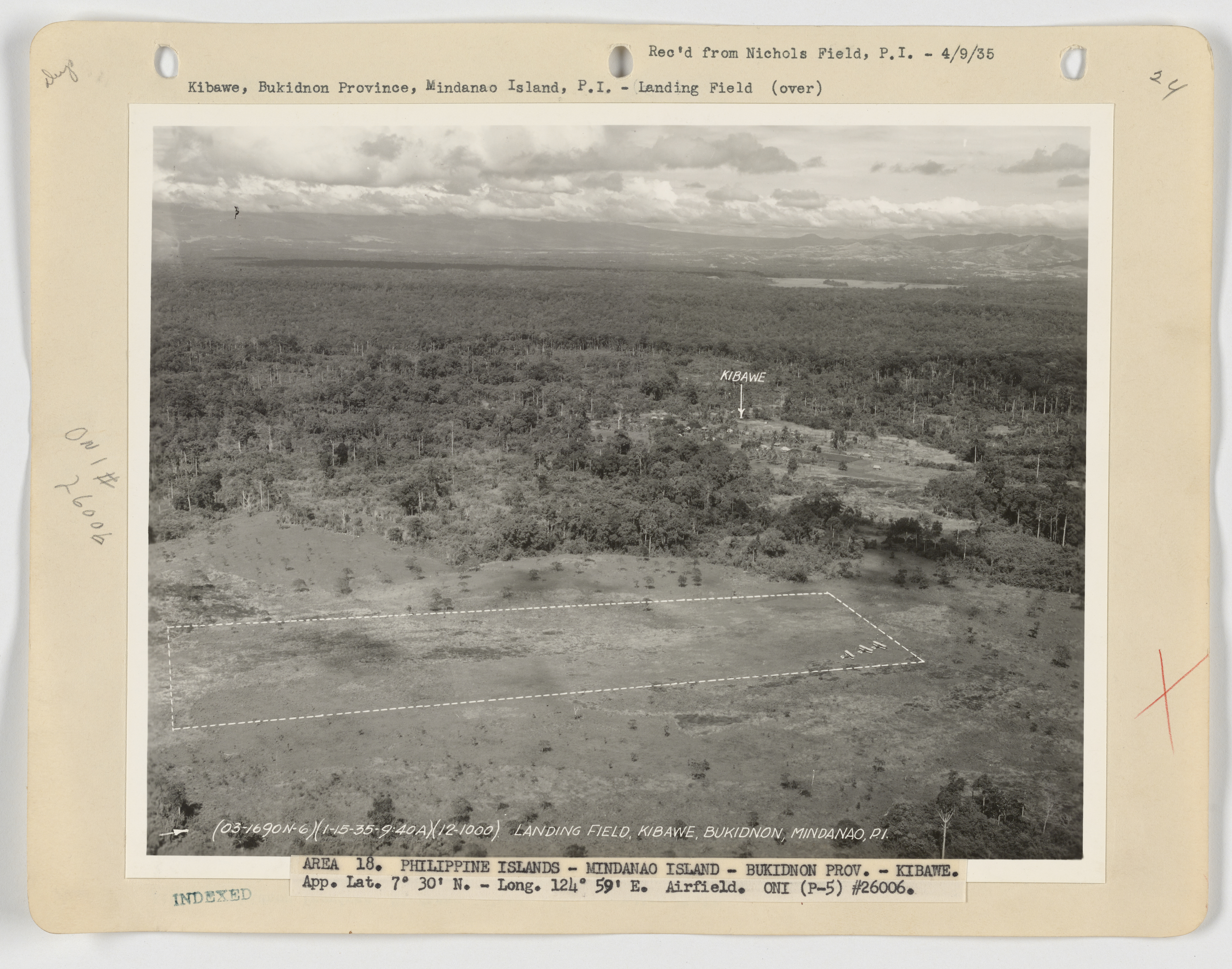
Aerial view of Kibawe and landing field, 1935

In the early days of the American regime, Kibawe was populated by a tribe of Mamadas people. The Mamadas people were nomadic by nature and subsisted on hunting and forest products. They maintained small plots of corn, camote and gabi in places where they built their temporary shelters. They practised a feudal type of government and were responsible only to their datus who governed as their political chieftain, judge, religious leader and armed-forces chief. The most famous among the “datus” was Datu Mambantayao. Datu Mambantayao's bravery and love for his subjects were unexcelled and remain in the hearts and minds of the people to this day. One of the historic events of his life as a datu was the capturing of a lady whom he loved. She was abducted by a tribe from Bugcaon, Malaybalay, Bukidnon, seventy kilometers away from Kibawe. Datu Mambantayao, along with his armed trained warriors marched to Bugcaon, which they attacked heavily, plundering and killing the Bugcaons’ chieftain for the recovery of the lady who he later married. Datu Mambantayao named this place Kibawe from the word “Guibawe” meaning recovery.

Bukidnon was eventually created as a separate province from Agusan. Kibawe became a barrio of Maramag. It now occupied the southern portion of Bukidnon, bounded on the north by Maramag, on the south by Damulog, on the east to southeast by Arakan and Pres. Roxas, Cotabato and on the west by Lanao Del Sur. It covered the present areas of the mother municipality of Kibawe, the daughter municipalities of Dangcagan, Damulog and Kadingilan and grand daughter municipality of Kitaotao, with a land area of approximately 1,250 km^{2} (480 sq mi)

Kibawe became a municipal district in 1931 and then became a regular municipality on July 1, 1956 under Executive Order 272 issued by then vice president, later president of the Philippines, Carlos P. Garcia. Later on, barrio Dangcagan separated into a regular municipality. The growth and development of the municipality served high after the Second World War as immigrants from all over the country (mainly from Visayas and Mindanao) came flocking into the fertile valleys and low mountains of the community.

The original populace of the town, the Manobos, have practically been replaced by the above-mentioned lowlanders. To date, only a few Manobos remain in the interior barrios. In the year 1972, the big barrios of Damulog and Kadingilan were created into separate municipalities. Thus, Kibawe retained the land area of 301.43 km^{2} (116.38 sq mi).

== Geography ==
Kibawe is at the center of Mindanao, located in southern Bukidnon. It is bounded in the north by the municipality of Dangcagan, on the south by the municipality of Damulog, on the east to southeast by the Municipalities of President Roxas and Arakan, North Cotabato Province, and on the west by the municipality of Kadingilan with Muleta River serving as a natural boundary. It has a total land area of 301.43 square kilometres (116.38 sq mi), with an approximate land elevation of 337 metres (1,106 ft) above sea level.

=== Barangays ===
Kibawe is politically subdivided into 23 barangays. Each barangay consists of puroks while some have sitios.

PSGC	Barangay	Population			±% p.a.	
		2024		2010		
101308003	Balintawak	1.9%	806	735	▴	0.64%
101308006	Cagawasan	2.1%	919	911	▴	0.06%
101308007	East Kibawe (Poblacion)	7.0%	3,031	2,777	▴	0.61%
101308008	Gutapol	4.0%	1,727	1,715	▴	0.05%
101308011	Pinamula	3.2%	1,400	1,133	▴	1.48%
101308013	Kiorao	1.5%	655	685	▾	−0.31%
101308014	Kisawa	1.9%	843	750	▴	0.81%
101308015	Labuagon	4.6%	1,983	1,890	▴	0.33%
101308016	Magsaysay	4.0%	1,731	1,541	▴	0.81%
101308018	Marapangi	5.1%	2,206	2,037	▴	0.55%
101308019	Mascariñas	1.6%	682	567	▴	1.29%
101308020	Natulongan	7.4%	3,211	2,716	▴	1.17%
101308021	New Kidapawan	3.6%	1,587	1,185	▴	2.04%
101308023	Old Kibawe	5.4%	2,353	2,108	▴	0.76%
101308028	Romagooc	5.5%	2,384	2,132	▴	0.78%
101308030	Sampaguita	3.3%	1,431	1,216	▴	1.13%
101308031	Sanipon	2.1%	932	669	▴	2.32%
101308032	Spring	3.6%	1,551	1,458	▴	0.43%
101308033	Talahiron	7.1%	3,092	2,929	▴	0.38%
101308034	Tumaras	1.8%	767	670	▴	0.94%
101308035	West Kibawe (Poblacion)	7.3%	3,176	3,004	▴	0.39%
101308036	Bukang Liwayway	2.2%	960	1,037	▾	−0.53%
101308037	Palma	5.0%	2,185	1,902	▴	0.96%
	Total		43,491	35,767	▴	1.36%

=== Topography ===
Kibawe has a larger percentage of rolling than plain areas. A rough estimate is 80% rolling hills and 20% plainlands. The important landmarks of the municipality are several mountain peaks, clustered over most of the barangays. Pulangi and Muleta Rivers serve as the major fishing grounds of the people residing near the bank, as do the beautiful and magnificent Paragupac Cave in Barangay Spring and the Ragubrob, and Mayabu springs at Barangay New Kidapawan.

=== Climate ===
The climate conditions of the entire municipality of Kibawe is pleasant and cool throughout the year. It is relatively dry from January to April and wet the rest of the year.

Climate data for Kibawe, Bukidnon
Month	Jan	Feb	Mar	Apr	May	Jun	Jul	Aug	Sep	Oct	Nov	Dec	Year
Mean daily maximum °C (°F)	28 (82)	28 (82)	29 (84)	30 (86)	30 (86)	29 (84)	28 (82)	29 (84)	29 (84)	29 (84)	29 (84)	29 (84)	29 (84)
Mean daily minimum °C (°F)	20 (68)	20 (68)	20 (68)	21 (70)	22 (72)	22 (72)	22 (72)	22 (72)	22 (72)	22 (72)	21 (70)	20 (68)	21 (70)
Average precipitation mm (inches)	44 (1.7)	27 (1.1)	32 (1.3)	35 (1.4)	76 (3.0)	117 (4.6)	108 (4.3)	108 (4.3)	94 (3.7)	100 (3.9)	76 (3.0)	46 (1.8)	863 (34.1)
Average rainy days	10.3	8.1	8.5	9.6	21.0	24.9	25.0	24.2	22.5	23.4	17.7	11.4	206.6
Source: Meteoblue

== Demographics ==
Population census of Kibawe
Year	Pop.	±% p.a.
1939	2,947	—
1948	5,588	+7.37%
1960	35,728	+16.72%
1970	56,239	+4.64%
1975	26,407	−14.07%
1980	26,949	+0.41%
1990	28,608	+0.60%
1995	30,783	+1.38%
2000	32,955	+1.47%
2007	35,213	+0.92%
2010	35,767	+0.57%
2015	39,612	+1.96%
2020	41,897	+1.19%
2024	43,491	+0.90%
Source: Philippine Statistics Authority

In the 2024 census, the population of Kibawe was 43,491 people, with a density of 140 inhabitants per square kilometre or 360 inhabitants per square mile.

== Economy ==
Poverty incidence of Kibawe (%)

Source: Philippine Statistics Authority

== Transportation ==
Kibawe is accessible by land transportation. The existing land transportation in the city consists of multicabs from nearby towns, single motorcycles, buses from Cagayan de Oro and General Santos, tricycles, and private vehicles facilitate the movement of people and goods to and from all places in the town. Traveling from Poblacion is mainly by land through all kinds of vehicles.

== Notable people ==
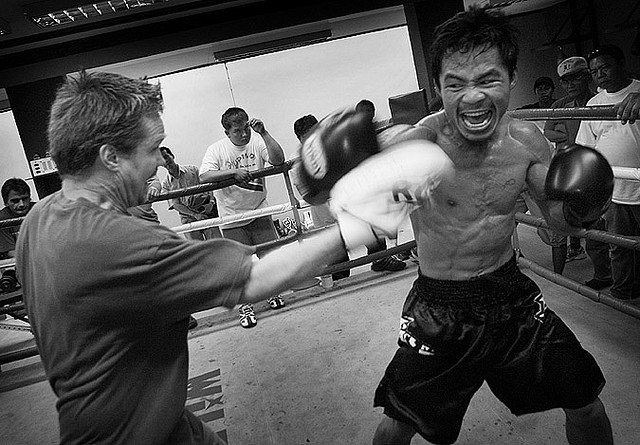
Manny Pacquiao

Manny Pacquiao, a boxer, eight-division world champion and Senator, was born in Kibawe on December 17, 1978.
