= Audrey Zubiri =

Filipino politician

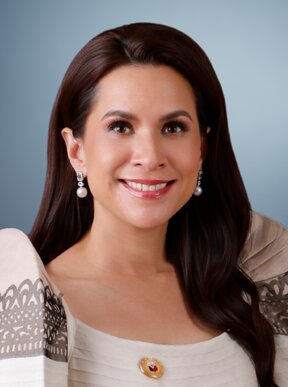
- Official portrait, 2025

Member of the Philippine House of Representatives from Bukidnon's 3rd District
- Incumbent
- Assumed office June 30, 2025
- Preceded by: Jose Maria Zubiri Jr.

Personal details
- Party: PFP (2024–present); BPP (local party; 2024–present)
- Spouse: Migz Zubiri

Audrey Kay Aquino Tan-Zubiri is a Filipino politician who is a member of the House of Representatives.

== Political career ==
In the 2025 Philippine House of Representatives elections, Zubiri succeeded her father-in-law Jose Maria Zubiri Jr., in Bukidnon's 3rd congressional district.

In 2026, she abstained in a vote on the second impeachment of Sara Duterte.

== Personal life ==
She is the wife of Senator Migz Zubiri. They have 3 children.

== See also ==
- List of female members of the House of Representatives of the Philippines
- 20th Congress of the Philippines
