= 2013 Bukidnon local elections =

2013 Bukidnon gubernatorial election
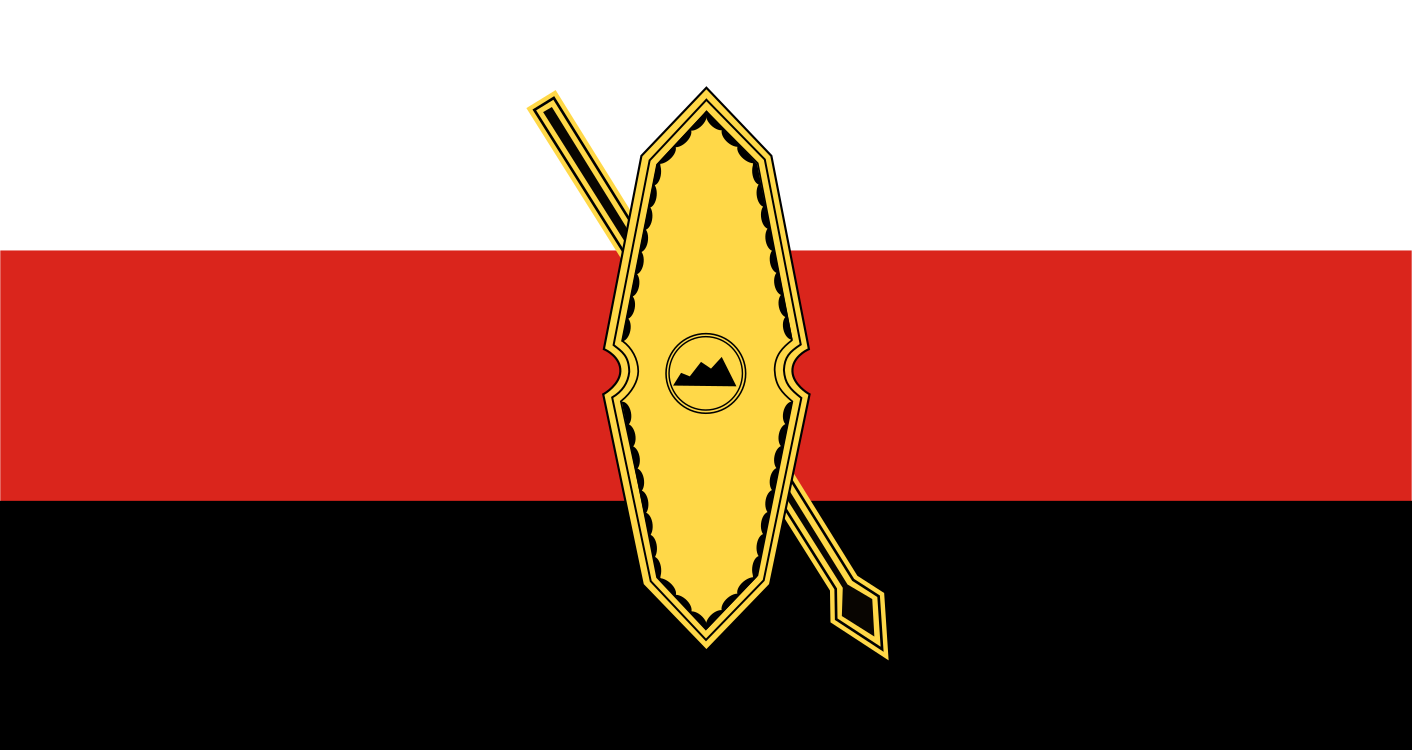
- May 13, 2013
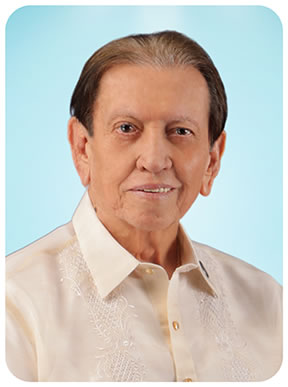
| Nominee | Jose Maria Zubiri, Jr. |
| Party | BPP |
| Running mate | Alex Calingasan |
| Popular vote | 294,042 |
| Percentage | 85.10% |
Governor before election
Alex Calingasan
BPP
Elected Governor
Jose Maria Zubiri, Jr.
BPP

Local elections were held in the province of Bukidnon on May 13, 2013, as part of the 2013 general election. Voters will select candidates for all local positions: a town mayor, vice mayor and town councilors, as well as members of the Sangguniang Panlalawigan, the vice-governor, governor and representatives for the four districts of Bukidnon.

== Provincial Elections ==
The candidates for governor and vice governor with the highest number of votes wins the seat; they are voted separately, therefore, they may be of different parties when elected.

=== Candidates for Governor ===
Parties are as stated in their certificate of candidacies.

Incumbent Gov.Alex Calingasan is running for Vice Governor. former Gov.Jose Maria Zubiri, Jr. is his party's nominee.

Bukidnon gubernatorial election
| Party | Candidate | Votes | % |
|---|---|---|---|
| BPP | Jose Maria Zubiri, Jr. | 294,042 | 85.10 |
| Independent | Lynard Allan Bigcas | 46,600 | 13.49 |
| Independent | Delfina Bicatulo | 2,815 | 0.81 |
| Independent | Romeo Zuce | 2,075 | 0.60 |
| Total votes | | 438,183 | 100.00 |
| BPP hold | | | |

=== Candidates for Vice-Governor ===
Parties are as stated in their certificate of candidacies.

Incumbent Vice Governor Jose Maria Zubiri, Jr. is running for Governor. Incumbent Gov.Alex Calingasan is his party's nominee.

Bukidnon vice gubernatorial election
| Party | Candidate | Votes | % |
|---|---|---|---|
| BPP | Alex Calingasan | 204,915 | 72.84 |
| Nacionalista | Nemesio Beltran, Jr. | 70,183 | 24.95 |
| Independent | Tony Dalao | 3,670 | 1.30 |
| Independent | Julio Vilianon | 2,567 | 0.91 |
| Total votes | | 438,183 | 100.00 |
| BPP hold | | | |

=== Congressional Election ===
Bukidnon was redistricted into four districts after the candidacies were submitted. As a result, the Commission on Elections (Philippines) will take into account the places where the nominees are registered to determine on what district they are running under.

==== 1st District ====
Jesus Emmanuel Paras is the incumbent.

2013 Philippine House of Representatives election at Bukidnon's 1st district
| Party | Candidate | Votes | % |
|---|---|---|---|
| Liberal | Maria Lourdes Acosta | 55,566 | 54.59 |
| NPC | Jesus Emmanuel Paras | 42,867 | 42.11 |
| Independent | Candido Pancrudo | 3,362 | 3.30 |
| Margin of victory | | 12,699 | 11.13% |
| Rejected ballots | | 12,305 | 10.78% |
| Total votes | | 114,100 | 100.00 |
| Liberal gain from NPC | | | |

==== 2nd District ====
Incumbent Florencio Flores is running unopposed.

2013 Philippine House of Representatives election at Bukidnon's 3rd district
| Party | Candidate | Votes | % |
|---|---|---|---|
| Nacionalista | Florencio Flores | 63,924 | 66.95 |
| Margin of victory | | 63,924 | 66.95% |
| Rejected ballots | | 31,560 | 33.05% |
| Total votes | | 95,484 | 100.00 |
| Nacionalista hold | | | |

==== 3rd District ====
Incumbent from the predistricted third district Jose Ma. Zubiri III found himself running at the redistricted 3rd district. His Bukidnon Paglaum party is in an electoral alliance with the Liberal Party.

2013 Philippine House of Representatives election at Bukidnon's 2nd district
| Party | Candidate | Votes | % |
|---|---|---|---|
| BPP | Jose Zubiri III | 100,405 | 71.18 |
| Aksyon | Ruth Acosta | 16,030 | 11.36 |
| Margin of victory | | 84,375 | 59.81% |
| Rejected ballots | | 24,632 | 17.46% |
| Total votes | | 141,067 | 100.00 |
| BPP hold | | | |

==== 4th District ====
The seat for the redistricted 4th District is open.

2013 Philippine House of Representatives election at Bukidnon's 3rd district
| Party | Candidate | Votes | % |
|---|---|---|---|
| NPC | Rogelio Neil Roque | 37,394 | 42.72 |
| Independent | Glenn Peduche | 19,754 | 22.57 |
| Liberal | Wenifredo Agripo | 17,617 | 20.13 |
| Margin of victory | | 17,640 | 20.15% |
| Rejected ballots | | 12,767 | 14.58% |
| Total votes | | 87,532 | 100.00 |
| NPC win (new seat) | | | |

=== Sangguniang Panlalawigan Elections ===
All 4 Districts of Bukidnon will elect Sangguniang Panlalawigan or provincial board members.

==== 1st District ====
Bukidnon 1st District Sangguniang Panlalawigan election
| Party | Candidate | Votes | % |
|---|---|---|---|
| Liberal | Jay Albarace | | |
| BPP | Clive Quiño | | |
| Total votes | | | |

==== 2nd District ====
Bukidnon 2nd District Sangguniang Panlalawigan election
| Party | Candidate | Votes | % |
|---|---|---|---|
| Aksyon | Roy Calimpong | | |
| Independent | Bob Casanova | | |
| Independent | Alvy Damasco | | |
| BPP | Manuel Dinlayan | | |
| Independent | Edgar Emperado | | |
| BPP | Melchor Maramara | | |
| Total votes | | | |

==== 3rd District ====
Bukidnon 3rd District Sangguniang Panlalawigan election
| Party | Candidate | Votes | % |
|---|---|---|---|
| Independent | Antolin Adlawan | | |
| Aksyon | Pastor Alvarez | | |
| BPP | Alping Baguio | | |
| Aksyon | Herbie Lumanog | | |
| BPP | Marivic Montesclaros | | |
| Aksyon | Susan Muñasque | | |
| BPP | Gordon Torres | | |
| Total votes | | | |

==== 4th District ====
Bukidnon 4th District Sangguniang Panlalawigan election
| Party | Candidate | Votes | % |
|---|---|---|---|
| BPP | Rene Centillas | | |
| Independent | Danilo Fegidero | | |
| Independent | Gino Armstrong Garcia | | |
| Independent | Miguelito Jardinico | | |
| Aksyon | Joseph Pasilan | | |
| BPP | Ranulfo Pepito | | |
| Independent | Lolita Rivera | | |
| Total votes | | | |

== City and Municipal Elections ==
All cities and municipalities of Bukidnon will elect mayor and vice-mayor this election. The candidates for mayor and vice mayor with the highest number of votes wins the seat; they are voted separately, therefore, they may be of different parties when elected. Below is the list of mayoralty candidates of each city and municipalities per district.

=== 1st District ===
- Municipality: Baungon, Libona, Malitbog, Manolo Fortich, Sumilao, Talakag

==== Baungon ====
Pedro Alvarez is the incumbent.

Baungon mayoralty election
| Party | Candidate | Votes | % |
|---|---|---|---|
| BPP | Pedro Alvarez | | |
| Independent | Boyong Jangao | | |
| Independent | Danda Lina-ac | | |
| Independent | Phillip Ragudo | | |
| Total votes | | | |

==== Libona ====
Incumbent Totom Calingasan is running unopposed.

Baungon mayoralty election
| Party | Candidate | Votes | % |
|---|---|---|---|
| BPP | Totom Calingasan | | |
| Total votes | | | |

==== Malitbog ====
Mayor Aida dela Rosa is no longer seeking reelection but her husband, former mayor Munding Dela Rosa is vying for the seat again.

Malitbog mayoralty election
| Party | Candidate | Votes | % |
|---|---|---|---|
| Independent | Toribio Dainhay, Jr. | | |
| BPP | Munding Dela Rosa | | |
| Independent | Benjamin Ebarle | | |
| Independent | Wilson Guiahan | | |
| Total votes | | | |

==== Manolo Fortich ====
Incumbent Rogelio Quiño is running unopposed.

Manolo Fortich mayoralty election
| Party | Candidate | Votes | % |
|---|---|---|---|
| BPP | Rogelio Quiño | | |
| Total votes | | | |

==== Sumilao ====
Rey Baula is the incumbent. he is challenge by councilor Dante Cuevas

Sumilao mayoralty election
| Party | Candidate | Votes | % |
|---|---|---|---|
| BPP | Rey Baula | | |
| Aksyon | Dante Cuevas | | |
| Total votes | | | |

==== Talakag ====
Nestor Macapayag is the incumbent. Vice Mayor Renato Sulatan is his main opponent.

Talakag mayoralty election
| Party | Candidate | Votes | % |
|---|---|---|---|
| BPP | Nestor Macapayag | | |
| Aksyon | Renato Sulatan | | |
| DPP | Rodnie Tinoy | | |
| Total votes | | | |

=== 2nd District ===
- City: Malaybalay City
- Municipality: Cabanglasan, Impasugong, Lantapan, San Fernando

==== Malaybalay City ====
Ignacio Zubiri is the incumbent. Vice Mayor Victor Aldeguer is his main opponent.

Malaybalay City mayoralty election
| Party | Candidate | Votes | % |
|---|---|---|---|
| Aksyon | Victor Aldeguer | | |
| Independent | Litoy Marabe | | |
| BPP | Ignacio Zubiri | | |
| Total votes | | | |

==== Cabanglasan ====
Rogelio Castillanes is the incumbent.

Cabanglasan mayoralty election
| Party | Candidate | Votes | % |
|---|---|---|---|
| Independent | Manolito Ampunan | | |
| BPP | Rogelio Castillanes | | |
| Aksyon | Dodong Inocando | | |
| Total votes | | | |

==== Impasugong ====
Mario Okinlay is the incumbent. he is challenge by Former Bukidnon Second Electric Cooperative board member Oliver Aldovino.

Impasug-ong mayoralty election
| Party | Candidate | Votes | % |
|---|---|---|---|
| Aksyon | Oliver Aldovino | | |
| BPP | Mario Okinlay | | |
| Total votes | | | |

==== Lantapan ====
Godofredo Balansag is the incumbent.

Lantapan mayoralty election
| Party | Candidate | Votes | % |
|---|---|---|---|
| BPP | Godofredo Balansag | | |
| Aksyon | Cito Labastilla | | |
| Total votes | | | |

==== San Fernando ====
Incumbent Laurencia Edma is no longer running. his husband Vice Mayor Levi Edma, Sr. is her party's nominee.

San Fernando mayoralty election
| Party | Candidate | Votes | % |
|---|---|---|---|
| BPP | Levi Edma, Sr. | | |
| PDP–Laban | Okit Onlas | | |
| Independent | Markus Villamor | | |
| Total votes | | | |

=== 3rd District ===
- Municipality: Damulog, Dangcagan, Don Carlos, Kadingilan, Kibawe, Kitaotao, Maramag, Quezon

==== Damulog ====
Romy Tiongco is the incumbent.

Damulog mayoralty election
| Party | Candidate | Votes | % |
|---|---|---|---|
| Independent | Conchita Mantagbo | | |
| Aksyon | Angelito Rivero | | |
| BPP | Romy Tiangco | | |
| Total votes | | | |

==== Dangcagan ====
Incumbent Edilberto Ayuban is term-limited and running for vice mayor instead. Vice Mayor Dodong Dandasan is his party's nominee.

Dangcagan mayoralty election
| Party | Candidate | Votes | % |
|---|---|---|---|
| Aksyon | Toto Cabunoc | | |
| BPP | Dodong Dandasan | | |
| Total votes | | | |

==== Don Carlos ====
Felix Manzano is the incumbent.

Don Carlos mayoralty election
| Party | Candidate | Votes | % |
|---|---|---|---|
| Independent | Dodong Derilo | | |
| Independent | Fabian Gardones | | |
| BPP | Felix Manzano | | |
| Total votes | | | |

==== Kadingilan ====
Joelito Talaid is the incumbent.

Kadingilan mayoralty election
| Party | Candidate | Votes | % |
|---|---|---|---|
| Aksyon | Jerry Canoy, Sr. | | |
| BPP | Joelito Talaid | | |
| Total votes | | | |

==== Kibawe ====
Minerva Casinabe is the incumbent. she is oppose by Coun.Rodulfo Jurado.

Kibawe mayoralty election
| Party | Candidate | Votes | % |
|---|---|---|---|
| BPP | Minerva Casinabe | | |
| Aksyon | Rodulfo Jurado | | |
| Total votes | | | |

==== Kitaotao ====
Incumbent Rodito Rafisura is term-limited. his party nominate Vice Mayor Tata Gawilan.

Kitaotao mayoralty election
| Party | Candidate | Votes | % |
|---|---|---|---|
| BPP | Tata Gawilan | | |
| Aksyon | Sammy Tilar | | |
| Total votes | | | |

==== Maramag ====
Alicia Resus is the incumbent.

Maramag mayoralty election
| Party | Candidate | Votes | % |
|---|---|---|---|
| Aksyon | Mcneil Acosta | | |
| BPP | Alicia Resus | | |
| Total votes | | | |

==== Quezon ====
Gregorio Gue is the incumbent. he will challenge by John John Fortich who is member of Fortich clan who ruled Bukidnon for several decades.

Quezon mayoralty election
| Party | Candidate | Votes | % |
|---|---|---|---|
| Independent | John John Fortich | | |
| BPP | Gregorio Gue | | |
| Aksyon | Bert Ramilo | | |
| Total votes | | | |

=== 4th District ===
- City: Valencia City
- Municipality: Kalilangan, Pangantucan

==== Valencia City ====
Leandro Jose Catarata is the incumbent. he is oppose by his political rival Jose Galario, Jr. and 2 city councilors Arlyn Ayon and Baby Mabao.

Valencia City mayoralty election
| Party | Candidate | Votes | % |
|---|---|---|---|
| PDP–Laban | Arlyn Ayon | | |
| BPP | Leandro Jose Catarata | | |
| Aksyon | Jose Galario, Jr. | | |
| Nacionalista | Baby Mabao | | |
| Total votes | | | |

==== Kalilangan ====
Incumbent Nenita Suyao is term-limited and running for Provincial Board Member instead. her party nominate Raymon Charl Gamboa.

Kalilangan mayoralty election
| Party | Candidate | Votes | % |
|---|---|---|---|
| BPP | Raymon Charl Gamboa | | |
| Independent | Omaradji Pizarro | | |
| Total votes | | | |

==== Pangantucan ====
Incumbent Manolito Garces is running unopposed.

Kalilangan mayoralty election
| Party | Candidate | Votes | % |
|---|---|---|---|
| BPP | Manolito Garces | | |
| Total votes | | | |
