= List of vice governors of Bukidnon =

Vice Governor of Bukidnon
- Incumbent; Clive Quiño since June 30, 2022
- Seat: Bukidnon Provincial Capitol
- Nominator: Political party
- Term length: 3 years Up to three terms

The Vice Governor of Bukidnon (Filipino: Pangalawang Punong Lalawigan ng Bukidnon) is the presiding officer of the Sangguniang Panlalawigan, the legislature of the provincial government of Bukidnon, Philippines.

The current vice governor is Clive Quiño, in office since 2022.

== List of Vice Governors ==
No.	Vice Governor	Term
1	Teodoro Oblad	1961–1964
2	Angelo Lopez	1976–1978
3	Esmeraldo Cudal	1980–March 1986; December 1987–1988
4	Alfredo Aquino	April–December 1986
5	Rube Gamolo	January–December 1987
6	Lorenzo Dinlayan	1988–1992
7	Nemesio Beltran	1992–February 2001
8	Teodorito J. Rejano	1998–2004
9	Wenifredo Agripo	February–June 2001
10	Alex Calingasan	July 2001–2010; 2013–2016; 2017–2018
11	Jose Maria Zubiri Jr.	2010–2013
12	Rogelio Quiño	2016–2017; 2018–2022
13	Clive Quiño	2022–present

== See also ==
- Governor of Bukidnon
