= Fortich =

Fortich is a surname. Notable people with the surname include:

- Antonio Fortich (1913–2003), Filipino Catholic bishop and activist
- Carlos Fortich (1935 or 1936–2019), Filipino politician
- José Fortich Ozámiz (1898–1944), Spanish Filipino lawyer and politician

== See also ==
- Manolo Fortich, a municipality in Bukidnon, Philippines
