= Philippine House Committee on Civil Service and Professional Regulation =

Standing committee of the House of Representatives of the Philippines

Committee on Civil Service and Professional Regulation
- 20th Congress

History
- New session started: July 28, 2025

Leadership
- Chair: Laarni Roque, Nacionalista since July 30, 2025
- Minority Leader: Vacant since June 30, 2025

Website
- Committee on Civil Service and Professional Regulation

The Philippine House Committee on Civil Service and Professional Regulation, or House Civil Service and Professional Regulation Committee is a standing committee of the Philippine House of Representatives.

== Jurisdiction ==
As prescribed by House Rules, the committee's jurisdiction includes the following:

- Organization, operation, management, rules and regulations of the civil service
- Regulation of admission to and the practice of professions
- Status, welfare and benefits of government officers and employees

== Members, 20th Congress ==
Position	Member	Constituency	Party
Chairperson	Laarni Roque	Bukidnon–4th	Nacionalista
Vice Chairpersons	Vacant		
Members for the Majority	Vacant		
Members for the Minority	Vacant		

== Historical membership rosters ==
=== 18th Congress ===
Position	Members	Party	Province/City	District
Chairperson	Frederick Siao	Nacionalista	Iligan	Lone
Vice Chairpersons	Juliet Marie Ferrer	NUP	Negros Occidental	4th
Vice Chairpersons	Raymond Democrito Mendoza	TUCP	Party-list	
Vice Chairpersons	Gerardo Valmayor Jr.	NPC	Negros Occidental	1st
Members for the Majority	Manuel Cabochan	MAGDALO	Party-list	
Members for the Majority	Dahlia Loyola	NPC	Cavite	5th
Members for the Majority	Pablo Ortega	NPC	La Union	1st
Members for the Majority	Precious Castelo	NPC	Quezon City	2nd
Members for the Majority	Cesar Jimenez Jr.	PDP–Laban	Zamboanga City	1st
Members for the Majority	Romeo Jalosjos Jr.	Nacionalista	Zamboanga del Norte	1st
Members for the Minority	Gabriel Bordado Jr.	Liberal	Camarines Sur	3rd
Members for the Minority	Ferdinand Gaite	Bayan Muna	Party-list	
Members for the Minority	Francisca Castro	ACT TEACHERS	Party-list	

== See also ==
- House of Representatives of the Philippines
- List of Philippine House of Representatives committees
- Civil Service Commission of the Philippines
- Professional Regulation Commission
