= Bukidnon Provincial Board =

Legislative body of the province of Bukidnon, Philippines

Bukidnon Provincial Board Hunta Probinsyal sa Bukidnon Hunta Probinsyal ta Bukidnon Sangguniang Panlalawigan ng Bukidnon
- 28th Bukidnon Provincial Board

Type
- Type: Unicameral
- Term limits: 3 terms (9 years)

Leadership
- Presiding Officer: Clive D. Quiño, Bukidnon Paglaum since June 30, 2022

Structure
- Seats: 14 board members 1 ex officio presiding officer
- Political groups: Bukidnon Paglaum (11) Nacionalista (1) Nonpartisan (2)
- Length of term: 3 years
- Authority: Local Government Code of the Philippines

Elections
- Voting system: Plurality-at-large (regular members); Indirect election (ex officio members); Acclamation (sectoral member)
- Last election: May 9, 2022
- Next election: May 12, 2025

Meeting place
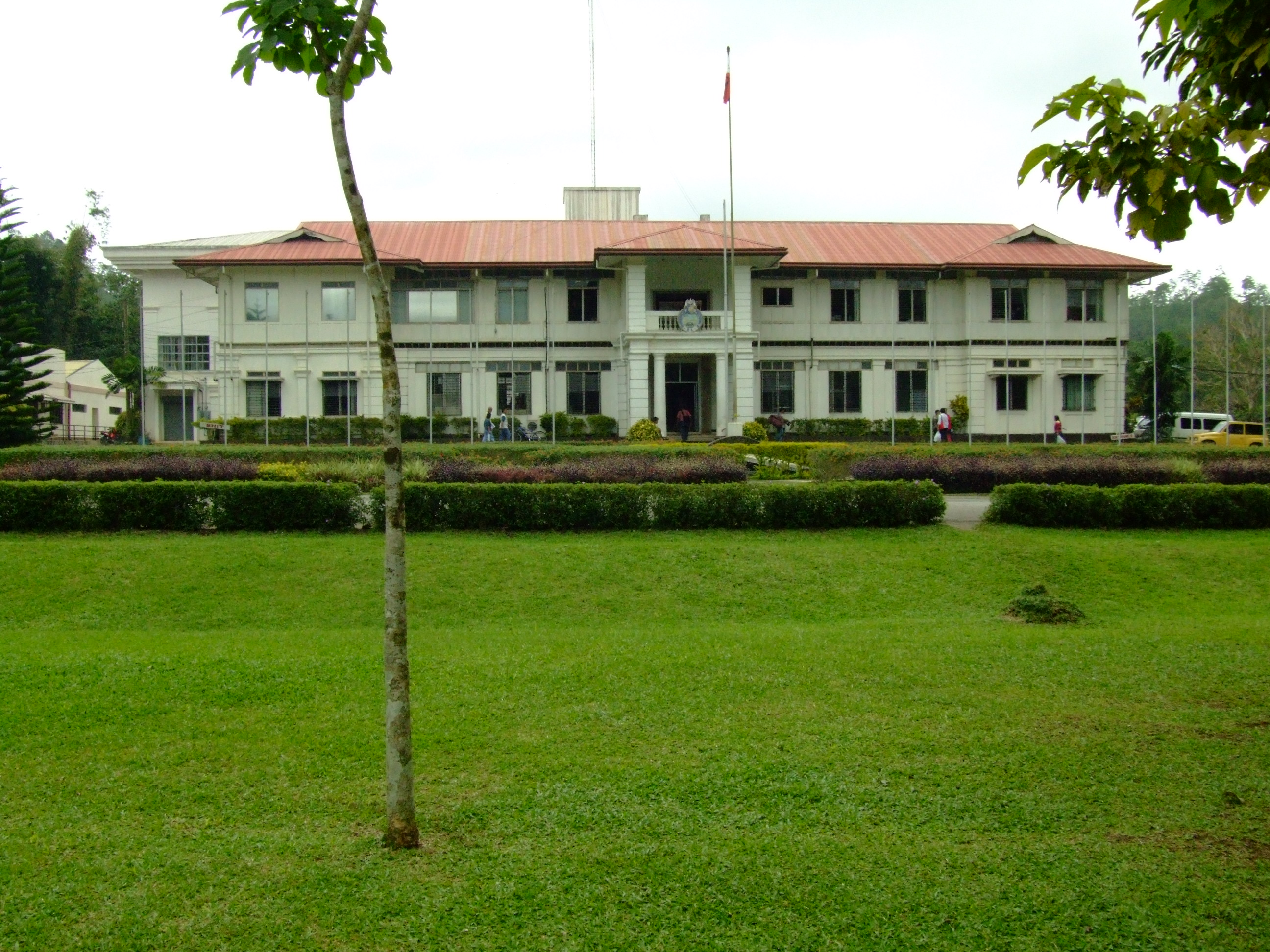
- Bukidnon Provincial Capitol, Malaybalay

The Bukidnon Provincial Board is the Sangguniang Panlalawigan (provincial legislature) of the Philippine province of Bukidnon.

The members are elected via plurality-at-large voting: the province is divided into three districts, the first and the third sending three members to the provincial board, while the second sends four members; the number of candidates the electorate votes, and the number of winning candidates, depends on the number of members their district sends. The vice governor is the ex officio presiding officer, and only votes to break ties. The vice governor is elected via the plurality voting system province-wide.

The districts used in appropriation of members is coextensive with the legislative districts of Bukidnon.

== District apportionment ==
Elections	No. of seats per district				Ex officio seats	Total seats
Elections	1st	2nd	3rd	4th	Ex officio seats	Total seats
2004–10	3	4	3	—	3	13
2013	2	3	3	2	3	13

== List of members ==
An additional three ex officio members are the presidents of the provincial chapters of the Association of Barangay Captains, the Councilors' League, the Sangguniang Kabataan provincial president; the municipal and city (if applicable) presidents of the Association of Barangay Captains, Councilor's League and Sangguniang Kabataan, shall elect amongst themselves their provincial presidents which shall be their representatives at the board.

=== Current members ===
These are the members after the 2025 local elections and 2023 barangay and SK elections:

- Vice Governor: Clive D. Quiño (BPP)

Seat	Board member	Party	Start of term	End of term
1st district	Mario B. Albarece, Jr.	BPP	June 30, 2022	June 30, 2028
1st district	Eliezer S. Onahon	BPP	June 30, 2022	June 30, 2028
2nd district	Marlon Brando B. Dinlayan	BPP	June 30, 2025	June 30, 2028
2nd district	Hollis E. Monsanto	BPP	June 30, 2022	June 30, 2028
2nd district	Bobby Jay B. Dinlayan	Independent	June 30, 2025	June 30, 2028
3rd district	Minerva C. Casinabe	BPP	June 30, 2019	June 30, 2028
3rd district	Joseph D. Palmada	BPP	June 30, 2022	June 30, 2028
3rd district	Jose Miguel S. Fortich	BPP	June 30, 2022	June 30, 2028
4th district	Ranulfo Jose Z. Pepito, Jr.	BPP	June 30, 2022	June 30, 2028
4th district	Oliver Owen L. Garcia	BPP	June 30, 2025	June 30, 2028
ABC	Godofredo I. Balansag	Nonpartisan		December 1, 2026
PCL	Armando "Jojo" S. Evangelista Jr.	BPP		June 30, 2028
SK	Rhea Lou S. Linas	Nonpartisan		December 1, 2026
IPMR	Renato S. Sumbongan	Nonpartisan		

=== Vice Governor (Presiding officer) ===
Election year	Name	Party
2001	Alex Calingasan	
2004	Alex Calingasan	Lakas
2007	Alex Calingasan	Lakas
2010	Jose Ma. Zubiri, Jr.	Lakas–Kampi
2013	Alex Calingasan	BPP
2016	Rogelio Quiño; Alex Calingasan	BPP
2019	Rogelio Quiño; Alex Calingasan	BPP
2022	Clive D. Quiño	BPP
2025	Clive D. Quiño	BPP

=== 1st District ===
Election year	Member (party)	Member (party)	Member (party)
2004	Ben Pancrudo (Lakas-CMD)	Alfredo Guden (Lakas-CMD)	Nickarter Onahon (Lakas-CMD)
2007	Ben Pancrudo (Lakas-CMD)	Clive Quiño (Lakas-CMD)	Rogelio Lago (Lakas-CMD)
2010	Jay Albarece (Liberal)	Clive Quiño (Lakas-Kampi)	Rogelio Lago (Lakas-Kampi)
2013	Jay Albarece (Bukidnon Paglaum)	Clive Quiño (Liberal)	—N/a
2016	Alex Calingasan (BPP)	Jay Alberece (Liberal)	—N/a
2019	Alex Calingasan (BPP)	Mario Alberece Jr. (BPP)	—N/a
2022	Mario B. Albarece Jr. (BPP)	Eliezer S. Onahon (Bukidnon Paglaum)	—N/a
2025	Mario B. Albarece Jr. (BPP)	Eliezer S. Onahon (Bukidnon Paglaum)	—N/a

=== 2nd District ===
Election year	Member (party)	Member (party)	Member (party)	Member (party)
2004	Ronald Deticio (Lakas-CMD)	Victor Aldeguer (Lakas-CMD)	Glenn Peduche (Lakas-CMD)	Camilo Pepito (Lakas-CMD)
2007	Ronald Deticio (Lakas-CMD)	Nemesio Beltran, Jr. (Lakas-CMD)	Glenn Peduche (Lakas-CMD)	Camilo Pepito (Lakas-CMD)
2010	Renato Centillas (Liberal)	Nemesio Beltran, Jr. (Lakas-Kampi)	Ranulfo Pepito (Lakas-Kampi)	Manuel Dinlayan (Lakas-Kampi)
2013	Manuel Dinlayan (BPP)	Melchor Maramara (Independent)	Bob Casanova (BPP)	—N/a
2016	Manuel Dinlayan (BPP)	Nemesio Beltran Jr. (BPP)	Melchor Maramara (BPP)	—N/a
2019	Lorenzo Dinlayan Jr. (BPP)	Nemesio Beltran Jr. (BPP)	Melchor Maramara (BPP)	—N/a
2022	Hollis C. Monsanto (Bukidnon Paglaum)	Lorenzo L. Dinlayan Jr. (Bukidnon Paglaum)	Nemesio B. Beltran Jr. (Bukidnon Paglaum)	—N/a
2025	Marlon Brando B. Dinlayan (Bukidnon Paglaum)	Hollis C. Monsanto (Bukidnon Paglaum)	Bobby Jay B. Dinlayan (Independent)	—N/a

=== 3rd District ===
Election year	Member (party)	Member (party)	Member (party)
2004	Rodolfo Abaquita (Lakas-CMD)	Anacleto Macias (Lakas-CMD)	Romeo Mabelin (Lakas-CMD)
2007	Anacleto Macias (Lakas-CMD)	Anacleto Macias (Lakas-CMD)	Romeo Mabelin (Lakas-CMD)
2010	Marivic Montescarlos (Lakas-Kampi)	Alfeo Baguio (Lakas-Kampi)	Gordon Torres (Lakas-Kampi)
2013	Marivic Montesclaros (Bukidnon Paglaum)	Alfeo Baguio (Bukidnon Paglaum)	Gordon Torres (Bukidnon Paglaum)
2016	Gordon Torres	Marivic Montesclaros	Benito Baguio (Bukidnon Paglaum)
2019	Joseph Palmada (Bukidnon Paglaum)	Minerva Casinabe (Bukidnon Paglaum)	Benito Baguio (Bukidnon Paglaum)
2022	Minerva C. Casinabe (BPP)	Benito U. Baguio (BPP)	Joseph D. Palmada (BPP)
2025	Minerva C. Casinabe (BPP)	Joseph D. Palmada (BPP)	Jose Miguel S. Fortich (BPP)

=== 4th District ===
Election year	Member (party)	Member (party)
2013	Renato Centillas (Bukidnon Paglaum)	Ranulfo Pepito (BPP)
2016	Gino Armstrong Garcia (Bukidnon Paglaum)	Ranulfo Pepito (BPP)
2019	Arlyn Ayon; Independent	Ranulfo Pepito (BPP)
2022	Rodrigo R. Rosal (Bukidnon Paglaum)	Ranulfo Jose Z. Pepito Jr. (Nacionalista)
2025	Ranulfo Jose Z. Pepito Jr. (BPP)	Oliver Owen L. Garcia (BPP)
