= Bukidnon's 4th congressional district =

House of Representatives of the Philippines legislative district

- Constituency for the House of Representatives of the Philippines
- Location of Bukidnon within the Philippines
- Province: Bukidnon
- Region: Northern Mindanao
- Population: 316,837 (2020)
- Electorate: 200,241 (2025)
- Major settlements: 3 LGUs: City; Valencia; Municipalities; Kalilangan; Pangantucan
- Area: 1,300.44 km^{2} (502.10 sq mi)

Current constituency
- Created: 2012
- Representative: Laarni Roque
- Political party: Nacionalista
- Congressional bloc: Majority

Bukidnon's 4th congressional district is one of the four congressional districts of the Philippines in the province of Bukidnon. It has been represented in the House of Representatives of the Philippines since 2013. The district consists of the province's most populous city, Valencia, and the municipalities of Kalilangan and Pangantucan. It is currently represented in the 20th Congress by Laarni Roque of the Nacionalista Party (NP).

== Representation history ==
| # | Image | Member | Term of office | | Congress | Party | Electoral history | Constituent LGUs |
| # | Image | Member | Start | End | Congress | Party | Electoral history | Constituent LGUs |
|---|---|---|---|---|---|---|---|---|
District created September 28, 2012.
| 1 | | Rogelio Neil Roque | June 30, 2013 | June 30, 2022 | 16th | NPC | Elected in 2013. | 2013–present: Kalilangan, Pangantucan, Valencia |
| 1 | | Rogelio Neil Roque | June 30, 2013 | June 30, 2022 | 17th | Nacionalista | Re-elected in 2016. | 2013–present: Kalilangan, Pangantucan, Valencia |
| 1 | | Rogelio Neil Roque | June 30, 2013 | June 30, 2022 | 18th | PRP | Re-elected in 2019. | 2013–present: Kalilangan, Pangantucan, Valencia |
| 2 | | Laarni Roque | June 30, 2022 | Incumbent | 19th | Nacionalista | Elected in 2022. | 2013–present: Kalilangan, Pangantucan, Valencia |
| 2 | | Laarni Roque | June 30, 2022 | Incumbent | 20th | Nacionalista | Re-elected in 2025. | 2013–present: Kalilangan, Pangantucan, Valencia |

== Election results ==
=== 2025 ===
| Candidate | Party | Votes | % |
|---|---|---|---|
| Laarni Roque (incumbent) | Nacionalista Party | 76,663 | 52.23 |
| Dan Dangallo | Independent | 65,940 | 44.92 |
| Jenson Pamisa | Independent | 4,190 | 2.85 |
| Total | | 146,793 | 100.00 |
| Valid votes | | 146,793 | 84.61 |
| Invalid/blank votes | | 26,706 | 15.39 |
| Total votes | | 173,499 | 100.00 |
| Registered voters/turnout | | 200,241 | 86.65 |
| Nacionalista Party hold | | | |
Source: Commission on Elections

=== 2022 ===
| Candidate | Party | Votes | % |
|---|---|---|---|
| Laarni Roque | Nacionalista Party | 95,837 | 67.10 |
| Babba Garcia | Bukidnon Paglaum | 46,997 | 32.90 |
| Total | | 142,834 | 100.00 |
| Total votes | | 165,775 | – |
| Registered voters/turnout | | 189,689 | 87.39 |
| Nacionalista Party gain from People's Reform Party | | | |
Source: Commission on Elections

=== 2016 ===
2016 Philippine House of Representatives election at Bukidnon's 4th District
| Party | Candidate | Votes | % |
|---|---|---|---|
| NPC | Rogelio Neil Roque | 66,964 | 63.70% |
| Independent | Jemsly James Bation | 36,067 | 34.31% |
| Independent | Beverly Navarro | 2,088 | 1.98% |
| Total votes | | 105,119 | 100.00% |

== See also ==
- Legislative districts of Bukidnon
