= Pangantucan =

Municipality in Bukidnon, Philippines

- Municipality
- Municipality of Pangantucan
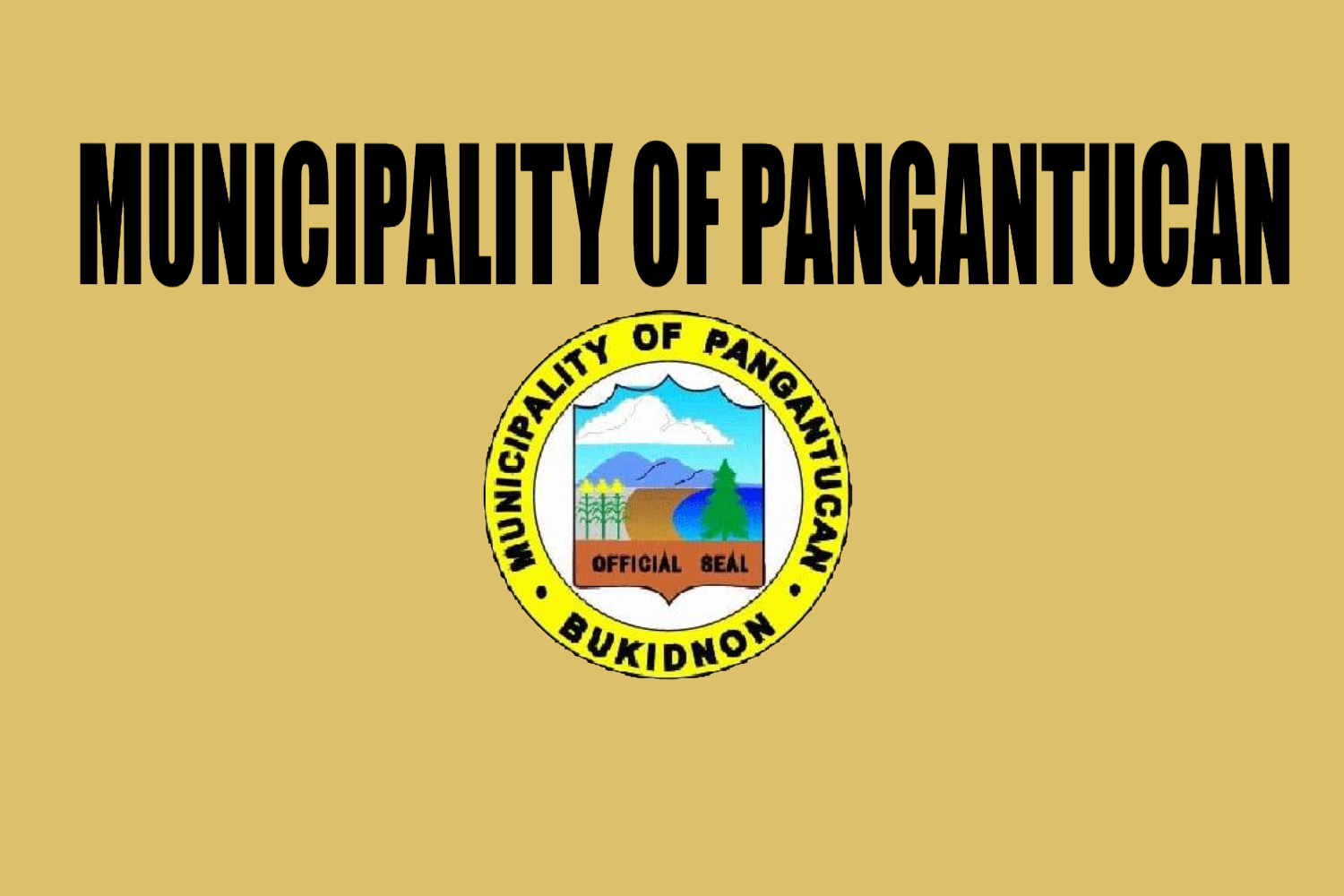
- Flag Seal

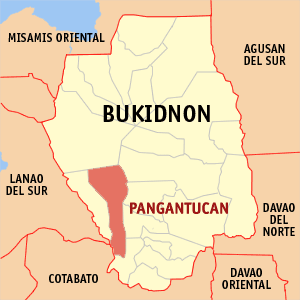
- Map of Bukidnon with Pangantucan highlighted
- Interactive map of Pangantucan
- Location within the Philippines
- Coordinates: 7°49′59″N 124°49′46″E
- Country: Philippines
- Region: Northern Mindanao
- Province: Bukidnon
- District: 4th district
- Founded: July 1, 1962
- Barangays: 19 (see Barangays)

Government
  - Type: Sangguniang Bayan
  - Mayor: Manolito G. Garces
  - Vice Mayor: Edward E. Hernandez
  - Representative: Laarni Roque
  - Municipal Council: Members: Pedro P. Liboon; Cristopher A. Garces; Armando S. Evangelista Jr.; Jab B. Gipulla; Ian Boy A. Garcenila; Edward E. Hernandez; Warlito R. Pactol; Pio L. Secadron Sr.
  - Electorate: 38,157 voters (2025)

Area
  - Total: 461.72 km^{2} (178.27 sq mi)
- Elevation: 801 m (2,628 ft)
- Highest elevation: 1,196 m (3,924 ft)
- Lowest elevation: 515 m (1,690 ft)

Population (2024 census)
  - Total: 60,162
  - Density: 130.30/km^{2} (337.47/sq mi)
  - Households: 13,188

Economy
  - Income class: 1st municipal income class
  - Poverty incidence: 28.54% (2023)
  - Revenue: ₱ 367.4 million (2024)
  - Assets: ₱ 1,265 million (2024)
  - Expenditure: ₱ 297.9 million (2024)
  - Liabilities: ₱ 242.9 million (2024)

Service provider
  - Electricity: First Bukidnon Electric Cooperative (FIBECO)
- Time zone: UTC+8 (PST)
- ZIP code: 8717
- PSGC: 1001316000
- IDD : area code: +63 (0)88
- Native languages: Binukid; Cebuano; Ata Manobo; Tagalog
- Website: www.pangantucanbuk.gov.ph

Pangantucan, officially the Municipality of Pangantucan (Cebuano: Lungsod sa Pangantucan; Tagalog: Bayan ng Pangantucan), is a municipality in the province of Bukidnon, Philippines. According to the 2024 census, it has a population of 60,162 people.

== History ==
The indigenous groups of Pangantucan are various Talaandig and Manobo tribes. It has also been settled by Dumagat (Visayans) in recent times.

The name “Pangantucan” means wisdom and strength in the Manobo languages and is said to refer to a white stallion that uprooted a bamboo stalk to warn his master, a tribal datu, of approaching raiders from other tribes.

Pangantucan was previously a barrio of Maramag. It was merged in 1931 with Adtuyon, Dominorog, Panalagsagan, Kalilangan and Barandias to form a separate municipal district. It was granted Municipal status in 1961.

== Geography ==
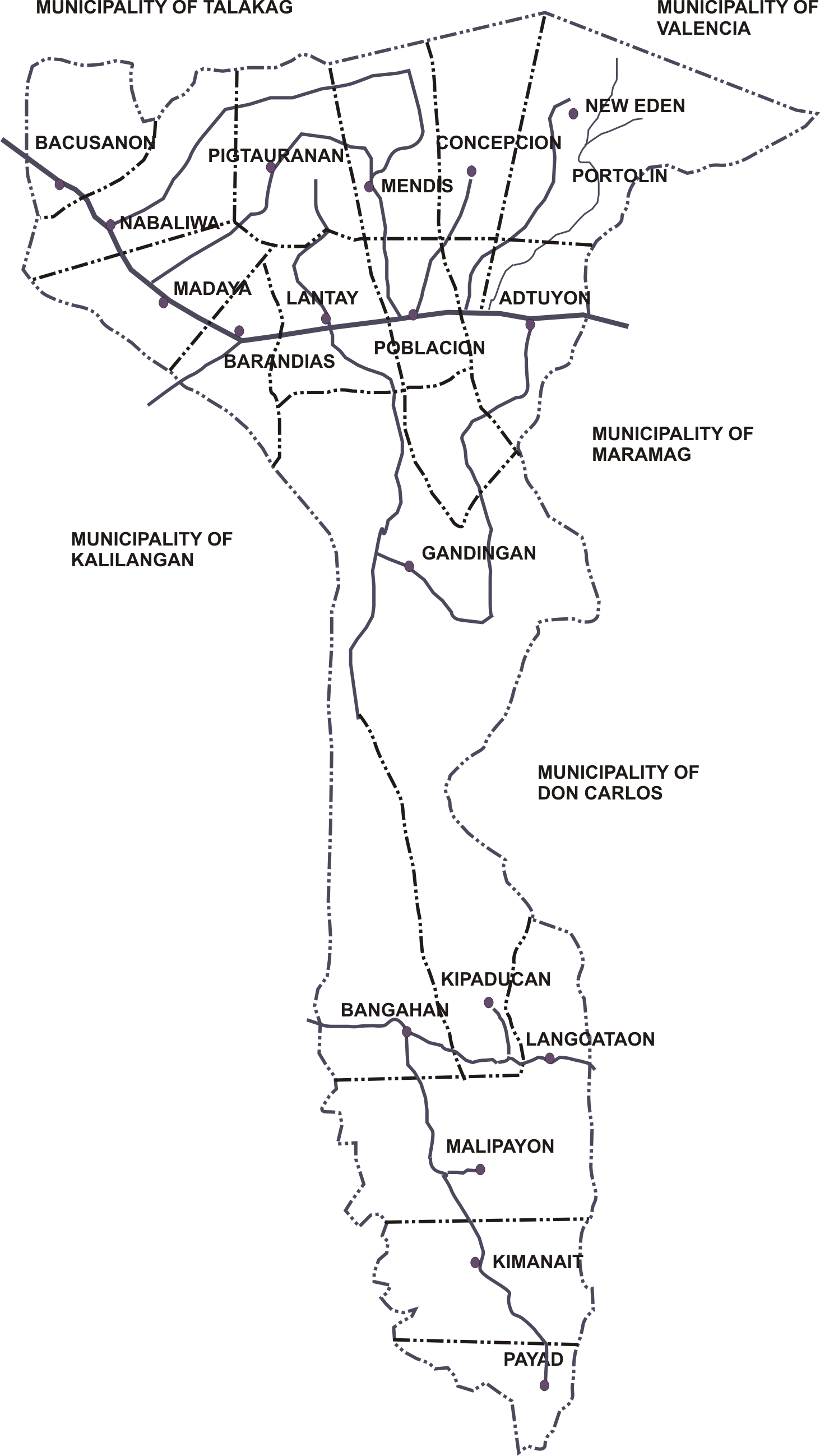
Map of Pangantucan

Pangantucan is situated in south–western Bukidnon and located approximately 75 kilometres (47 mi) south of the provincial capital Malaybalay.

Pangantucan shares borders to its south-west and south with the provinces of Lanao del Sur and Cotabato. Within Bukidnon, Kalilangan lies west of Pangantucan while on its north-west is Mount Kitanglad. Valencia is located to the north while Maramag, Don Carlos and Kadingilan are located to the east and south.

Pangantucan has a land area of 46,172 hectares (114,090 acres), making it the ninth largest component subdivision of Bukidnon.

Pangantucan is also home to lakes Napalit and Mata, which are located at a distance of one kilometer from each other in Barangay Pigtauranan. Lake Napalit is a tectonic lake situated outside Mount Kalatungan. It has an estimated area of 36 hectares and a depth of 80 feet and also contains an islet. In between the two lakes is a marsh containing naturally bonsai-ed trees and tikog plants.

=== Barangays ===
Pangantucan is politically subdivided into 19 barangays. Each barangay consists of puroks while some have sitios.

PSGC	Barangay	Population			±% p.a.	
		2024		2010		
101316001	Adtuyon	6.9%	4,151	3,670	▴	0.86%
101316002	Bacusanon	9.3%	5,569	4,182	▴	2.01%
101316003	Bangahan	4.5%	2,702	2,674	▴	0.07%
101316004	Barandias	4.4%	2,673	2,126	▴	1.60%
101316005	Concepcion	1.4%	816	658	▴	1.50%
101316006	Gandingan	3.0%	1,825	1,907	▾	−0.30%
101316007	Kimanait	6.2%	3,739	3,557	▴	0.35%
101316008	Kipadukan	2.8%	1,676	1,784	▾	−0.43%
101316009	Langcataon	3.4%	2,065	2,122	▾	−0.19%
101316010	Lantay	3.8%	2,266	2,131	▴	0.43%
101316011	Madaya	2.6%	1,552	1,294	▴	1.27%
101316012	Malipayon	5.1%	3,042	3,203	▾	−0.36%
101316013	Mendis	2.3%	1,401	1,278	▴	0.64%
101316014	Nabaliwa	3.7%	2,226	1,780	▴	1.56%
101316015	New Eden	2.0%	1,177	1,112	▴	0.39%
101316016	Payad	2.1%	1,255	1,239	▴	0.09%
101316017	Pigtauranan	4.1%	2,480	2,445	▴	0.10%
101316018	Poblacion	18.2%	10,970	10,339	▴	0.41%
101316019	Portulin	2.6%	1,541	1,274	▴	1.33%
	Total		60,162	48,775	▴	1.47%

=== Topography ===
Pangantucan is characterized by hilly and mountainous areas. To its north-west portion is Mount Kalatungan, the second highest peak in Bukidnon with an elevation of 2,824 metres (9,265 ft).

=== Climate ===
The climate of Pangantucan is of Type IV of the Modified Corona's Climate Classification. It is characterized by more or less evenly distributed rainfall throughout the year with rare incidences of tropical cyclones. Rainfall is influenced by the rain shadow generated by the mountain ranges of eastern Bukidnon and adjoining highlands.

Climate data for Pangantucan, Bukidnon
Month	Jan	Feb	Mar	Apr	May	Jun	Jul	Aug	Sep	Oct	Nov	Dec	Year
Mean daily maximum °C (°F)	27 (81)	28 (82)	28 (82)	29 (84)	27 (81)	26 (79)	26 (79)	27 (81)	27 (81)	26 (79)	27 (81)	27 (81)	27 (81)
Mean daily minimum °C (°F)	20 (68)	20 (68)	20 (68)	21 (70)	22 (72)	21 (70)	21 (70)	21 (70)	21 (70)	21 (70)	21 (70)	20 (68)	21 (70)
Average precipitation mm (inches)	174 (6.9)	145 (5.7)	159 (6.3)	192 (7.6)	302 (11.9)	343 (13.5)	297 (11.7)	265 (10.4)	244 (9.6)	293 (11.5)	306 (12.0)	188 (7.4)	2,908 (114.5)
Average rainy days	17.4	14.4	17.4	21.3	27.6	28.0	27.9	26.9	25.0	26.9	26.0	21.1	279.9
Source: Meteoblue

== Demographics ==
Population census of Pangantucan
Year	Pop.	±% p.a.
1939	2,165	—
1948	1,869	−1.62%
1960	12,356	+17.04%
1970	17,458	+3.51%
1975	24,734	+7.24%
1980	29,065	+3.28%
1990	35,777	+2.10%
1995	38,418	+1.34%
2000	43,202	+2.55%
2007	46,689	+1.08%
2010	48,775	+1.60%
2015	53,126	+1.64%
2020	56,580	+1.33%
2024	60,162	+1.48%
Source: Philippine Statistics Authority

In the 2024 census, the population of Pangantucan was 60,162 people, with a density of 130 inhabitants per square kilometre or 340 inhabitants per square mile.

Most in the municipality where is majority are Catholics. Some of the people are practiced are Islam as well indigenous religion.

== Economy ==
Poverty incidence of Pangantucan (%)

Source: Philippine Statistics Authority
