= 2013 Valencia, Bukidnon, local elections =

2013 Valencia, Bukidnon local elections
- May 13, 2013
Nominee	Leandro H. Catarata	Arlyn P. Ayon
Party	BPP	PDP–Laban
Alliance	Liberal	UNA
Running mate	Azucena P. Huervas	Almer M. Alfonso, Sr.
Popular vote	23,581	1,667
Percentage	39.05%	2.76%
Nominee	Cleofe A. Mabao	Jose M. Galario, Jr.
Party	Nacionalista	Aksyon
Popular vote	9,626	25,519
Percentage	15.94%	42.25%
Mayor before election
Leandro H. Catarata
Lakas–Kampi
Elected mayor
Jose M. Galario, Jr.
Aksyon

The local elections of Valencia City was held on May 13, 2013 in conjunction with the Philippine general election. The voters elected several local posts in the city: the mayor, vice mayor, and ten members of the sangguniang panlungsod. Each official is elected publicly to a 3-year term and can be re-elected up to 3 terms in succession.

In 2013, the city has 120,411 registered voters with a 24.25% increase from the 2010 statistics of 96,913 registered voters. Since Valencia City is a component city and is still in the jurisdiction of the Province of Bukidnon, its registered voters still need to vote for the provincial posts: the governor, vice-governor, one congressman, and two members of the sangguniang panlalawigan. Also in this elections, since Valencia is redistricted from the third to the newly created fourth legislative district of Bukidnon, its registered voters will now have to vote for a district representative coming from the latter instead of the former.

== Candidates ==
Mayor Leandro Jose H. Catarata was the incumbent on his second term and ran for a third term under the banner of Bukidnon Paglaum Party of the Zubiris who had forged an alliance with the Liberal Party. Jose M. Galario, who had been the mayor of the city from 2001 until 2007, and who also ran and lost on the same post in the 2010 local elections, ran for the fourth time. For the first time, incumbent Sangguniang Panlungsod members Arlyn P. Ayon of the Partido Demokratiko Pilipino-Lakas ng Bayan, and Cleofe A. Mabao of the Nacionalista Party, also ran for the vetted post.

Incumbent Vice-Mayor Azucena P. Huervas ran for the vied for the post as the running mate of Catarata. Huervas was previously the President of Valencia's Association of Barangay Captains, but was assigned to replace the post vacated by Vice-Mayor Benjamin Verano, Sr. who died in office. Incumbent Sangguniang Panlungsod members Rhea Rhenna H. Agripo, and Almer M. Alfonso, Sr. of Partido Demokratiko Pilipino-Lakas ng Bayan challenged Huervas for the said post.

Incumbent Sangguniang Panlungsod members Francisco L. Alkuino, Glen G. Galario, Rolando P. Laviña, and Camilo E. Pepito were all seeking for reelection. Twenty-four others, who are running under a political party such as Partido Demokratiko Pilipino-Lakas ng Bayan and Nacionalista Party, or as an independent candidate, also ran for the vetted 10 seats in the city legislative council. Some ran again for a post after they had failed to win a seat during the 2010 local elections.

== Results ==
=== Mayor ===
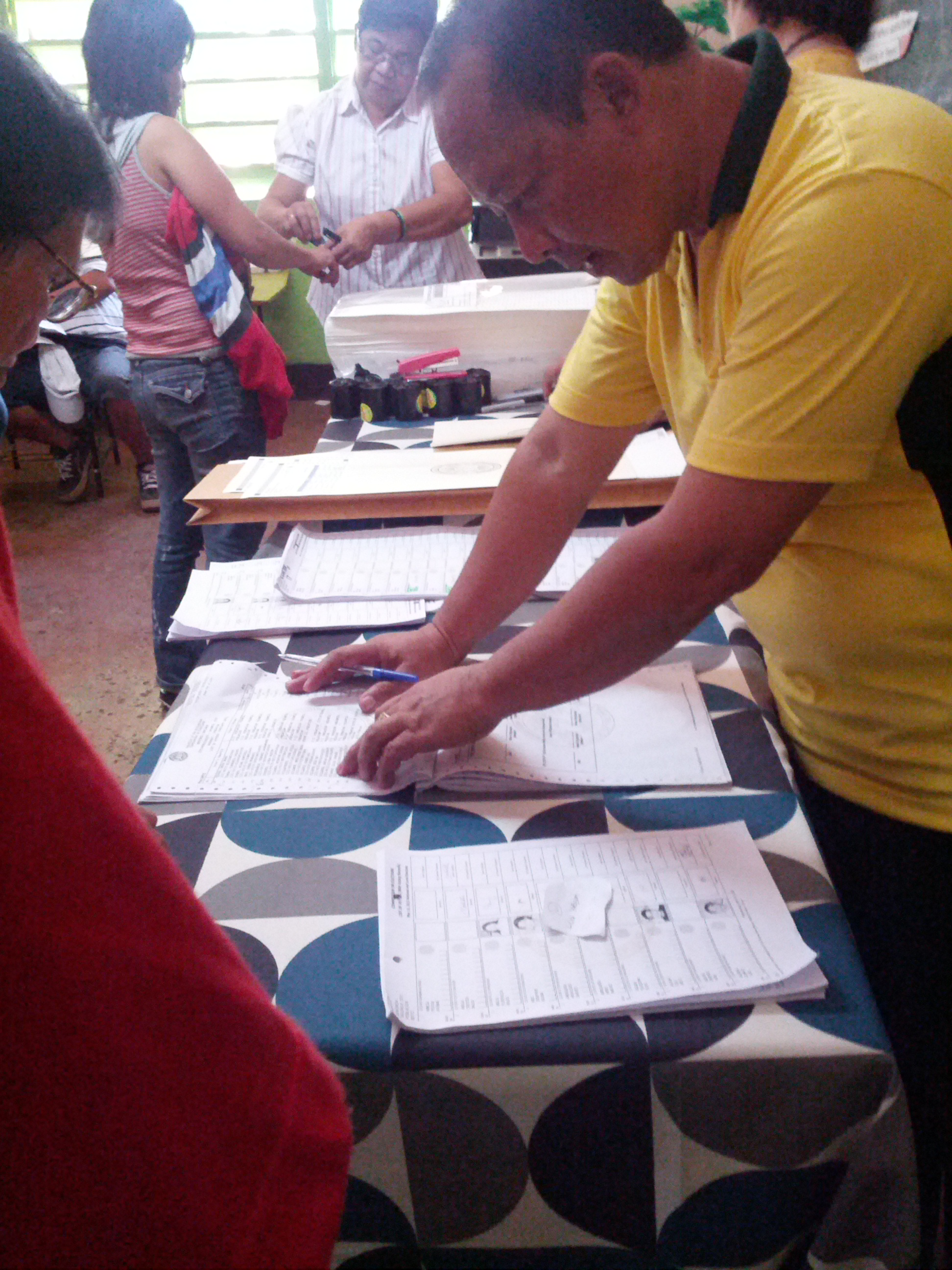
An election officer in Precinct 0017 in Barangay Poblacion looking up for a voter's name in the voter's list.

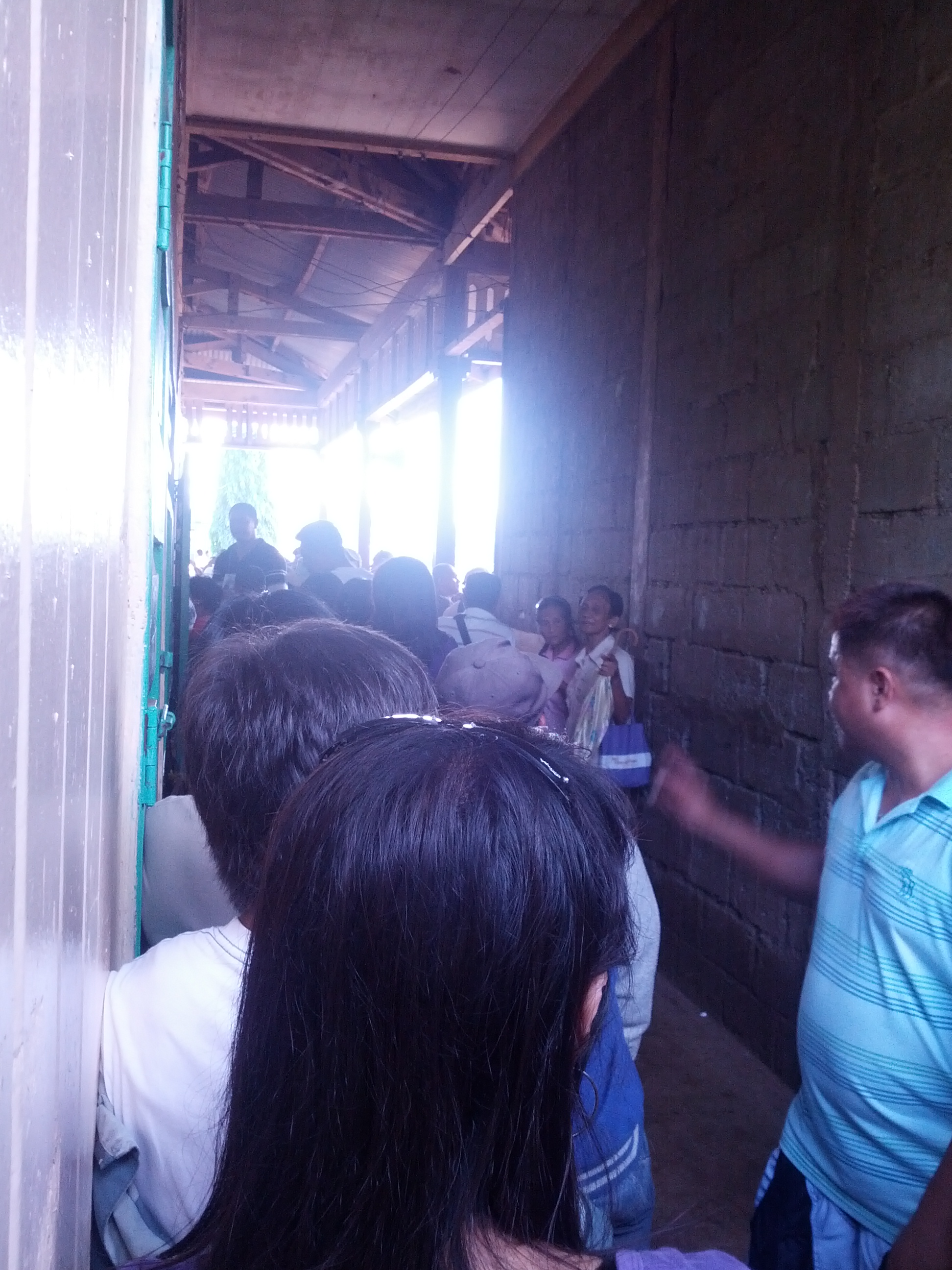
Voters of Election Precinct 0017 in Barangay Poblacion lining up for the elections.

Valencia City mayoralty election
Party	Candidate	Votes	%
Aksyon	Jose M. Galario Jr.	25,519	42.25
BPP	Leandro Jose H. Catarata	23,581	39.05
Nacionalista	Cleofe A. Mabao	9,626	15.94
PDP–Laban	Arlyn P. Ayon	1,667	2.76
Total votes		60,393	100.00

=== Vice-Mayor ===
Valencia City vice mayoralty election
Party	Candidate	Votes	%
BPP	Azucena P. Huervas	25,522	49.72
PDP–Laban	Almer M. Alfonso, Sr.	13,822	26.93
Independent	Rhea Rhenna H. Agripo	11,987	23.35
Total votes		51,331	100.00

=== Sangguniang Panlungsod ===
NOTE: Results for the 2010 local elections are found at COMELEC's official website.

Sangguniang Panlungsod composition before and after the elections
Third Sangguniang Panlungsod		Fourth Sangguniang Panlungsod	
Name	Party	Name	Party
Rhea Rhenna H. Agripo	Liberal	Helen T. Bernal	Independent
Almer M. Alfonso, Sr.	Lakas–Kampi	Roland D. Centillas, Jr.	Independent
Francisco L. Alkuino	Lakas–Kampi	Eduardo D. Chan	BPP
Arlyn P. Ayon	Lakas–Kampi	Glen G. Galario	Independent
Glen G. Galario	NPC	Oliver Owen L. Garcia	BPP
Rolando P. Laviña	Lakas–Kampi	Rolando P. Laviña	BPP
Cleofe A. Mabao	Lakas–Kampi	Policarpo P. Murillo IV	Nacionalista
Glenn P. Peduche	Lakas–Kampi	Camilo E. Pepito	BPP
Camilo E. Pepito	Lakas–Kampi	John Lee B. Quillo	Independent
Rogelio Neil P. Roque	Lakas–Kampi	Rodrigo A. Rosal	BPP
Vicente C. Desebayla (ABC President)^{1}		Vicente C. Desebayla (ABC President)^{1}	
Czarina Eloise C. Berou (SK President)^{2}		Czarina Eloise C. Berou (SK President)^{2}	

1. ^ ^{a} ^{b} Vicente C. Desebayla took over Azucena P. Huervas' position after Huervas was assigned to take over Verano's vice-mayoralty post after his death. Desabalya ran for the 2013 elections for the Sangguniang Lungsod, but failed to win a seat. However, he will still be the ABC President until the Barangay and Sangguniang Kabataan elections on October 28, 2013.
2. ^ ^{a} ^{b} Czarina Eloise C. Berou will still serve as the SK President until the Barangay and Sangguniang Kabataan elections on October 28, 2013.

==== Per candidate ====
Valencia City Sangguniang Panlungsod elections
Party	Candidate	Votes	%
BPP	Rolando P. Laviña	24,613	6.39
BPP	Oliver Owen L. Garcia	24,556	6.37
BPP	Rodrigo A. Rosal	23,457	6.09
Independent	Glen G. Galario	22,657	5.88
Independent	John Lee B. Quillo	21,638	5.61
BPP	Eduardo D. Chan	21,495	5.58
BPP	Camilo E. Pepito	21,360	5.54
Independent	Helen T. Bernal	21,329	5.53
Nacionalista	Policarpo P. Murillo IV	20,726	5.38
Independent	Roland D. Centillas, Jr.	18,509	4.80
PDP–Laban	Almer B. Alfonso, Jr.	18,067	4.69
BPP	Francisco L. Alkuino	17,230	4.47
Independent	Lizzamae Grace A. Laviña	16,381	4.25
Independent	Cicero Augustus H. Catarata	15,830	4.11
BPP	Vicente C. Desebalya	14,149	3.67
Independent	Gloria G. Abejuela	12,521	3.25
Independent	Caesar Enrico R. de los Reyes	12,105	3.14
Independent	Mirzi Myra A. Gamboa	11,619	3.01
Independent	Francisco S. Berou	10,769	2.79
Independent	Allan D. Verano	10,248	2.66
Independent	Eduardo Y. Garcia	8,535	2.21
Independent	Benjamin D. Verano, Jr.	6,000	1.56
Independent	Ihra Mark O. Potestas, Sr.	5,461	1.42
Independent	Elvira C. Valiente	3,757	0.97
Independent	Vicente B. Vaguchay	1,740	0.45
Independent	Jennyliza D. Carzon	677	0.18
Total votes		385,429	100.00
