= Carlos Fortich =

Filipino politician

Governor of Bukidnon
- In office June 30, 1992 – February 2, 2001
- Vice Governor: Nemesio Beltran
- Preceded by: Ernesto Tabios
- Succeeded by: Nemesio Beltran
- In office 1980–1987
- Vice Governor: Esmeraldo Cudal
- Preceded by: Timoteo Ocaya
- Succeeded by: Esmeraldo Cudal
- In office 1968–1978
- Vice Governor: Angelo Lopez
- Preceded by: Teodoro Oblad
- Succeeded by: Angelo Lopez

Regional Mambabatas Pambansa for Northern Mindanao
- In office 1978–1984

Personal details
- Born: Carlos Ozamiz Fortich; 1935 or 1936 Philippine Commonwealth
- Died: February 24, 2019 (aged 83) Cagayan de Oro, Philippines
- Party: Lapian ng Masang Pilipino
- Other political affiliations: Lakas–CMD (1997–2000); UNIDO (1986); Kilusang Bagong Lipunan (1978–1985)
- Occupation: Politician

Carlos "Totoy" Ozamiz Fortich was a Filipino politician who was the longest serving governor of Bukidnon.

== Career ==
Fortich served as governor of Bukidnon in several non-consecutive terms. He was first elected as governor in 1968 until 1978 when he was elected to the Interim Batasang Pambansa under President Ferdinand Marcos' Kilusang Bagong Lipunan (KBL). When the interim legislature ended and was replaced by the Regular Batasang Pambansa in 1984, he was succeeded by Lorenzo S. Dinlayan and Jose Ma. R. Zubiri.

He would return as Bukidnon governor in 1980. On December 31, 1985, Fortich left the KBL to join the opposition coalition United Nationalist Democratic Organization (UNIDO), and thus avoided being immediately replaced with a caretaker governor after the People Power Revolution ousted Marcos and had Corazon Aquino installed as president, with Fortich later burning an image of Marcos and his wife Imelda in Malaybalay. He would be replaced as governor in December 1987 by vice governor Esmeraldo Cudal.

Fortich became governor again of Bukidnon in 1992 and was re-elected for two consecutive terms. In October 2000, Fortich defected from the Lakas–NUCD opposition party to join President Joseph Estrada's Lapian ng Masang Pilipino just prior the latter's impeachment trial on corruption charges. Fortich's governorship ended when he resigned on February 2, 2001, after which he launched a failed bid to get elected as mayor of Valencia in 2001 before deciding to retire from politics.

== Death ==
Fortich died on February 24, 2019, at the Capitol University Medical Center (CUMC) in Cagayan de Oro. He was 83 years old. His remains were buried at the Shepherds Meadow Memorial Park in Malaybalay.
