= Kalilangan =

Municipality in Bukidnon, Philippines

Kalilangan كاليلاڠان
- Municipality
- Municipality of Kalilangan
- Flag Seal
- Nicknames: Gateway to Lanao, Gateway to Bangsamoro
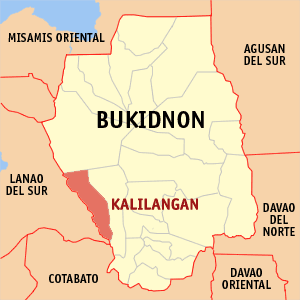
- Map of Bukidnon with Kalilangan highlighted
- Interactive map of Kalilangan
- Location within the Philippines
- Coordinates: 7°44′47″N 124°44′51″E
- Country: Philippines
- Region: Northern Mindanao
- Province: Bukidnon
- District: 4th district
- Founded: January 1, 1968
- Barangays: 14 (see Barangays)

Government
  - Type: Sangguniang Bayan
  - Mayor: Atty. Raymon Charl O. Gamboa
  - Vice Mayor: Joel L. Padsing
  - Representative: Laarni Lavin-Roque
  - Municipal Council: Members: Loido L. Padsing; Oliver B. Guibao; Wildred P. Ramas; Johnny P. Padsing; Fredimel P. Bajao; Melbourne Vaughn A. Pendon; Charlie James Paul M. Lacdo-o; Rosa C. Dator
  - Electorate: 27,913 voters (2025)

Area
  - Total: 251.43 km^{2} (97.08 sq mi)
- Elevation: 593 m (1,946 ft)
- Highest elevation: 1,119 m (3,671 ft)
- Lowest elevation: 465 m (1,526 ft)

Population (2024 census)
  - Total: 44,108
  - Density: 175.43/km^{2} (454.36/sq mi)
  - Households: 10,055

Economy
  - Income class: 1st municipal income class
  - Poverty incidence: 28.45% (2023)
  - Revenue: ₱ 253.7 million (2024)
  - Assets: ₱ 744.8 million (2024)
  - Expenditure: ₱ 251.5 million (2024)
  - Liabilities: ₱ 138.1 million (2024)

Service provider
  - Electricity: First Bukidnon Electric Cooperative (FIBECO)
- Time zone: UTC+8 (PST)
- ZIP code: 8718
- PSGC: 1001307000
- IDD : area code: +63 (0)88
- Native languages: Binukid; Cebuano; Ata Manobo; Iranun; Tagalog; Maranao
- Major religions: Roman Catholicism, Islam
- Website: www.kalilangan.gov.ph

Kalilangan, officially the Municipality of Kalilangan (Bukid and Higaonon: Banuwa ta Kalilangan; Iranun and Maranao: Inged a Kalilangan; Cebuano: Lungsod sa Kalilangan; Tagalog: Bayan ng Kalilangan), is a municipality in the province of Bukidnon, Philippines. According to the 2024 census, it has a population of 44,108 people.

== Etymology ==
The term kalilangan came from a Maranao native tongue which means "extreme happiness". It used to be a barrio of Pangantucan, Bukidnon. Due to tremendous influx of settlers coming from the different parts of the country, it becomes an independent municipality.

== History ==
In 1951 Kalilangan become one of the settlement areas under the LASEDECO (Land Settlement and Development Corporation). Christian settlers came and settled in this place. When LASEDECO was dissolved, it was replaced immediately by National Resettlement Rehabilitation Administration (NARRA) during the time of then President Ramon Magsaysay. Another batch of settlers came composed of different tribes and other ethnic groups in the country. They were Cebuanos, Waray, Boholanos, Bicolanos, Tagalogs, Ivatans, Ilonggos, Ilocanos, Capangpangan and other tribes in the island of Mindanao. Settlers were given aid by the government particularly working animals, subsistence, farm tools and others. As years rolled on land cultivation progressed and the settlers started planting different kinds of crops. Roads were opened and commerce flowed freely to the new barrio of Kalilangan. Other settlers also started engaging in business

As Kalilangan was considered as one of the most progressive barrios in the municipality of Pangantucan and by virtue of Republic Act No. 4788 approved on June 18, 1966, a bill was sponsored by ex-Congressman Benjamin N. Tabios, creating Kalilangan into a municipality and was organized and implemented on January 1, 1968, just after the 1967 elections.

== Geography ==
The Municipality of Kalilangan is bounded on the north by the Municipality of Talakag, on the east and south by the Municipality of Pangantucan and on the west by the Province of Lanao del Sur. It has a land area of 28,414.10 hectares. The municipalities of Talakag and Pangantucan are claiming some parts of the municipality. Talakag claims 2,427.50 hectares of land in the northern portion of the municipality while Pangantucan is also contesting for 691.0 hectares of Kalilangan's land area.

=== Barangays ===
Kalilangan is politically subdivided into 14 barangays. Each barangay consists of puroks while some have sitios.

PSGC	Barangay	Population			±% p.a.	
		2024		2010		
101307001	Bangbang	3.1%	1,365	1,227	▴	0.74%
101307002	Barorawon	2.6%	1,128	1,033	▴	0.61%
101307003	Canituan	2.9%	1,289	1,354	▾	−0.34%
101307004	Kibaning	2.1%	941	849	▴	0.72%
101307005	Kinura	5.4%	2,398	2,060	▴	1.06%
101307006	Lampanusan	7.2%	3,181	3,120	▴	0.13%
101307007	Macaopao	6.8%	2,996	2,897	▴	0.23%
101307008	Malinao	13.0%	5,728	6,038	▾	−0.37%
101307009	Pamotolon (Pamotdon)	3.6%	1,579	1,256	▴	1.60%
101307010	Poblacion	16.5%	7,284	6,874	▴	0.40%
101307012	Public	5.3%	2,338	2,058	▴	0.89%
101307013	Ninoy Aquino	8.9%	3,908	3,279	▴	1.23%
101307014	San Vicente Ferrer	6.8%	3,007	3,535	▾	−1.12%
101307015	West Poblacion	10.1%	4,459	4,267	▴	0.31%
	Total		44,108	39,847	▴	0.71%

=== Topography ===
Kalilangan is characterized by rugged terrain with a limited plain or level area situated on the Poblacion and portion of the municipality. From its total land area, a dominant 76.57 percent are within 8-15 percent slope characterized by moderately undulating and gently rolling land. The barangays of San Vicente Ferrer and Ninoy Aquino are dominantly within this slope type.

Areas with 18 percent slope and above cover 15.61 percent. These are very steepy sloping and rolling land in many directions. The barangays of Macaopao, Lampanusan, portions of Kibaning, Public and Pamotolon are dominantly within the slope type.

The remaining 7.82 percent of the municipality level to nearly level land and gently sloping areas in one general direction within 0-3 percent, 3-5 percent and 5-15 percent slopes. These are common in the Poblacion portion of the municipality.

=== Climate ===
Climate data for Kalilangan, Bukidnon
Month	Jan	Feb	Mar	Apr	May	Jun	Jul	Aug	Sep	Oct	Nov	Dec	Year
Mean daily maximum °C (°F)	26 (79)	26 (79)	27 (81)	27 (81)	26 (79)	25 (77)	25 (77)	25 (77)	25 (77)	25 (77)	25 (77)	26 (79)	26 (78)
Mean daily minimum °C (°F)	18 (64)	18 (64)	19 (66)	20 (68)	20 (68)	20 (68)	20 (68)	19 (66)	20 (68)	20 (68)	20 (68)	19 (66)	19 (67)
Average precipitation mm (inches)	174 (6.9)	145 (5.7)	159 (6.3)	192 (7.6)	302 (11.9)	343 (13.5)	297 (11.7)	265 (10.4)	244 (9.6)	293 (11.5)	306 (12.0)	188 (7.4)	2,908 (114.5)
Average rainy days	17.4	14.4	17.4	21.3	27.6	28.0	27.9	26.9	25.0	26.9	26.0	21.1	279.9
Source: Meteoblue

== Demographics ==
Population census of Kalilangan
Year	Pop.	±% p.a.
1970	12,325	—
1975	16,893	+6.53%
1980	18,316	+1.63%
1990	23,923	+2.71%
1995	26,973	+2.27%
2000	30,592	+2.74%
2007	36,557	+2.49%
2010	39,847	+3.19%
2015	41,601	+0.82%
2020	43,711	+1.05%
2024	44,108	+0.22%
Source: Philippine Statistics Authority

In the 2024 census, the population of Kalilangan was 44,108 people, with a density of 180 inhabitants per square kilometre or 470 inhabitants per square mile.

=== Historical growth ===
It was on 1970 that the Municipality of Kalilangan first attempted to conduct a census in its area of jurisdiction. On that year a total of 12,326 inhabitants have been registered by the Philippine Statistics Authority (NSO). Five years later NSO conducted another Census of Population registering 15,389 inhabitants revealing that for 5 years time 1970-1975 the municipality has reached a population increase of 24.85%. On the next 5 years from 1975 to 1980 NSO recorded 19.01% of inhabitants as has been added to the population of the municipality, revealing therefore that a population growth rate drop of 5.84% compared to that of 1970-1975 had happened.

After 10 years the next population census had been conducted by NSO registering a population of 23,923 inhabitants on 1990. In comparison with the municipality's census two decades ago, from 1970 to 1980 and from 1980 to 1990 a population increase of 48.58% and 30.62% respectively was observed. In terms of population growth rate (1970-1980 has 4.04% and 1980-1990 2.70%)

Important population data also came up for population trend analysis was the 1990-1995 population census revealing a population increase of 12.75% with a population growth rate of 2.43%

Another population increase was recorded when official result of May 1, 2000 census of population was published. It recorded a total of 30, 592 persons for the municipality with 5,873 households, an average household size of 5 persons and recorded an average of 2.74 birth rate and death rate of 0.24.

The 2007 Census shows an increase in the population to 36,557.

=== Language ===
Presently Kalilangan was inhabited by about 47 different tribes with different languages on which 36% were Binukid, 24% Cebuano, 20% Maranao and Iranun, 6% Hiligaynon, 6% Ivatan, and 5% Boholano. Binukid the dominant language in the municipality.

=== Religion ===
In terms of denomination, Kalilangan has about 21 known numbers of religious affiliation on which prevailing dominant group is the Roman Catholicism of about 46.9%, followed by Islam which is equivalent to 37.22%. Other group of Baptism of 2.88%, Assembly of God of 2.23%, Iglesia ni Cristo of 2.02%, and the remaining 9.25% belongs to the remaining sixteen (16) other denominations.

== Economy ==
Poverty incidence of Kalilangan (%)

Source: Philippine Statistics Authority
