= Lake Pinamaloy =

- Location within the Philippines
- Location: Bukidnon, Mindanao
- Coordinates: 7°40′13″N 124°59′59″E
- Type: lake
- Basin countries: Philippines
- Surface area: 60 ha (0.60 km^{2})
- Surface elevation: 312 m (1,023.62 ft)
- Islands: none
- Settlements: Don Carlos

Lake Pinamaloy is a freshwater lake located in the municipality of Don Carlos in the province of Bukidnon of Mindanao in the Philippines. It has an estimated area of 60 hectares (0.60 km^{2}). The lake is fed by local run-off and is the main source of potable water for the municipality as well as its main tourist attraction.

Proclamation No. 381

ESTABLISHING AS PINAMALOY FOREST RESERVE FOR FOREST PROTECTION AND TIMBER PRODUCTION A PARCEL OF PUBLIC DOMAIN SITUATED IN THE MUNICIPAL DISTRICTS OF MARAMAG AND KIBAWE, PROVINCE OF BUKIDNON, ISLAND OF MINDANAO.

Upon the recommendation of the Director of Forestry, approved by the Secretary of Agriculture and Commerce, and pursuant to the provisions of section eighteen hundred and twenty-six of Act Numbered Twenty-seven hundred and eleven, known as the Revised Administrative Code, I, Manuel L. Quezon, President of the Philippines, hereby establish for forest protection and timber production the Pinamaloy Forest Reserve and place it under the administration and control of the Bureau of Forestry, which shall have the authority to regulate the use and occupancy of this reserve and the cutting, collection, and removal of timber and other forest products therein in accordance with the Forest Law and Regulations.

I, therefore, withdraw from entry, sale, or settlement, and hereby declare and proclaim to be Pinamaloy Forest Reserve subject to private rights if any there be, the parcel of public domain situated in the municipal districts of Maramag and Kibawe, Province of Bukidnon, Island of Mindanao, and described in the Bureau of Forestry map No. F. R. 89, to wit:

Beginning at corner 1 on Bureau of Forestry map No. F. R. 89, a white lauan tree, 70 cm. in diameter, marked L. C. 2550/68, identical to corner 72, alienable and disposable Bukidnon project No. 9-A; which is S. 16″ E., approximately 12.6 kilometers from Maramag, Bukidnon; thence N. 73° E., 260 meters to corner 2, a white lauan tree, 50 cm. in diameter, marked L. C. 2550/66, identical to corner 71, alienable and disposable Bukidnon project No. 9-A; thence N. 9° E., 220 meters to corner 3, a white lauan tree, 40 cm. in diameter, marked L. C. 2550/63, identical to corner 70, alienable and disposable Bukidnon project No. 9-A; thence N. 35° E., 290 meters to corner 4, a magabuyo tree, 50 cm. in diameter, marked L. C. 2550/60, identical to corner 69, alienable and disposable Bukidnon project No. 9-A; thence N. 35° E., 240 meters to corner 5, a white lauan tree, 90 cm. in diameter, marked L. C. 2550/57, identical to corner 68, alienable and disposable Bukidnon project No. 9-A; thence N. 37° W., 200 meters to corner 6, a white lauan tree, 50 cm. in diameter, marked L. G. 2550/55, identical to corner 67, alienable and disposable Bukidnon project No. 9-A; thence N. 5° E., 280 meters to corner 7, a binuang tree, 70 cm. in diameter, marked L. C. 2550/52 identical to corner 66, alienable and disposable Bukidnon project No. 9-A; thence N. 4° E., 250 meters to corner 8, a white lauan tree, 70 cm. in diameter, marked L. C. 2550/50, identical to corner 65, alienable and disposable Bukidnon project No. 9-A; thence N. 54° W., 240 meters to corner 9, a kiwan tree, 70 cm. in diameter, marked L. C. 2550/47, identical to corner 64, alienable and disposable Bukidnon project No. 9-A; thence N. 45° W., 280 meters to corner 10, an antipolo tree, 70 cm. in diameter, marked L. C. 2550/45, identical to corner 63, alienable and disposable Bukidnon project No. 9-A; thence N. 69° W., 110 meters to corner 11, a taluto tree, 40 cm. in diameter, marked L. C. 2550/44, identical to corner 62, alienable and disposable Bukidnon project No. 9-A; thence N. 38° W., 170 meters to corner 12, a balobo tree, 50 cm. in diameter, marked L. G. 2550/42, identical to corner 61, alienable and disposable Bukidnon project No. 9-A; thence N. 62° W., 260 meters to corner 13, a white lauan tree, 60 cm. in diameter, marked L. C. 2550/39, identical to corner 60, alienable and disposable Bukidnon project No. 9-A; thence N. 51° W., 290 meters to corner 14, a Eugenia specie tree, 80 cm. in diameter, marked L. C. 2550/36, identical to corner 59, alienable and disposable Bukidnon project No. 9-A; thence N. 33° W., 280 meters to corner 15, a white lauan tree, 70 cm. in diameter, marked L. C. 2550/33, identical to corner 58, alienable and disposable Bukidnon project No. 9-A; thence N. 25° W., 280 meters to corner 16, a white lauan tree, 50 cm. in diameter, marked L. C. 2550/30, identical to corner 57, alienable and disposable Bukidnon project No. 9-A; thence N. 41° W., 280 meters to corner 17, a katmon tree, 40 cm. in diameter, marked L. C. 2550/27, identical to corner 56, alienable and disposable Bukidnon Project No. 9-A; thence S. 62° W., 290 meters to corner-is, a molave tree, 40 cm. in diameter, marked L. C. 2550/25, identical to corner 55, alienable and disposable Bukidnon project No. 9-A; thence N. 10° E., 260 meters to corner 19, a Eugenia specie tree, 30 cm. in diameter, marked L. C. 2550/23, identical to corner 54, alienable and disposable Bukidnon project No. 9-A; thence N. 79° W., 160 meters to corner 20, an unknown tree, 50 cm. in diameter, marked L. C. 2550/21, identical to corner 53, alienable and disposable Bukidnon project No. 9-A; thence S. 73° W., 280 meters to corner 21, a molave tree, 40 cm. in diameter, marked L. C. 2550/18, identical to corner 52, alienable and disposable Bukidnon project No. 9-A; thence S. 70° W., 240 meters to corner 22, a paguringon tree, 30 cm. in diameter, marked L. C. 2550/16, identical to corner 51, alienable and disposable Bukidnon project No. 9-A; thence S. 81° W., 280 meters to corner 23, a paguringon tree, 40 cm. in diameter, marked L. C. 2550/13, identical to corner 50, alienable and disposable Bukidnon project No. 9-A; thence S. 78° W., 240 meters to corner 24, a molave tree, 60 cm. in diameter, marked L. C. 2550/11, identical to corner 49, alienable and disposable Bukidnon project No. 9-A; thence S. 88° W., 240 meters to corner 25, a white lauan tree, 80 cm. in diameter, marked L. C. 2549/3, identical to corner 48, alienable and disposable Bukidnon project No. 9-A; thence N. 69° W., 220 meters to corner 26, a macaasim tree, 30 cm. in diameter, marked L. C. 2549/5, identical to corner 47, alienable and disposable Bukidnon project No. 9-A; thence N. 87° W., 240 meters to corner 27, a binayuyo tree, 30 cm. in diameter, marked L. C. 2549/7, identical to corner 46, alienable and disposable Bukidnon project No. 9-A; thence S. 85° W., 310 meters to corner 28, a binayuyo tree, 25 cm. in diameter, marked L. C. 2549/8, identical to corner 45, alienable and disposable Bukidnon project No. 9-A; thence S. 88° W., 390 meters to corner 29, a bondag tree, 45 cm. in diameter, marked L. C. 2549/9, identical to corner 44, alienable and disposable Bukidnon project No. 9-A; thence due west 250 meters to corner 30, a white lauan tree, 40 cm. in diameter, marked L. C. 2549/10, identical to corner 43, alienable and disposable Bukidnon project No. 9-A; thence S. 74° W., 240 meters to corner 31, a white lauan tree, 50 cm. in diameter, marked L. C. 2549/14, identical to corner 42, alienable and disposable Bukidnon project No. 9-A; thence S. 63° W., 260 meters to corner 32, a Eugenia specie tree, 30 cm. in diameter, marked L. C. 2549/15, identical to corner 41, alienable and disposable Bukidnon project No. 9-A; thence S. 67° W., 210 meters to corner 33, a white lauan tree, 70 cm. in diameter, marked L. C. 2549/16, identical to corner 40, alienable and disposable Bukidnon project No. 9-A; thence S. 56° W., 150 meters to corner 34, a margapali tree, 25 cm. in diameter, marked L. C. 2549/17, identical to corner 39, alienable and disposable Bukidnon project No. 9-A; thence S. 9° W., 140 meters to corner 35, a malaikmo tree, 50 cm. in diameter, marked L. C. 2549/22, identical to corner 38, alienable and disposable Bukidnon project No. 9-A; thence S. 2° E., 120 meters to corner 36, a white lauan tree, 30 em. in diameter, marked L. C. 2549/24, identical to corner 37, alienable and disposable Bukidnon project No. 9-A; thence S. 36° W., 190 meters to corner 37, a makaasi’m tree, 30 cm. in diameter, marked L. C. 2549/26, identical to corner 36, alienable and disposable Bukidnon project No. 9-A; thence S. 9° W., 130 meters to corner 38, a white lauan tree, 40 cm. in diameter, marked L. C. 2549/28, identical to corner 35, alienable and disposable Bukidnon project No. 9-A; thence S. 15° W., 320 meters to corner 39, a dalindingan tree, 30 cm. in diameter, marked L. C. 2549/30, identical to corner 34, alienable and disposable Bukidnon project No. 9-A; thence following Kitaotao Creek downstream in general northwesterly and southwesterly directions, about 2,840 meters to corner 40, an Aglaia specie tree, 35 cm. in diameter, marked F. Z. 1127/19, identical to corner 196, alienable and disposable block I, Bukidnon project No. 9; thence N. 1° W., 360 meters to corner 41, a balulao tree, 50 cm. in diameter, marked F. Z. 1127/14, identical to corner 195, alienable and disposable block I, Bukidnon project No. 9; thence N. 7° W., 270 meters to corner 42, a molave tree, 80 cm. in diameter, marked F. Z. 1127/11, identical to corner 194, alienable and disposable block I, Bukidnon project No. 9; thence N. 27° E., 360 meters to corner 43, a molave tree, 130 cm. in diameter, marked F. Z. 1127/7, identical to corner 193, alienable and disposable block I, Bukidnon project No. 9; thence N. 45° E., 450 meters to corner 44, a white lauan tree, 60 cm. in diameter, marked F. Z. 1127/2, identical to corner 192, alienable and disposable block I, Bukidnon project No. 9; thence N. 57° E., 420 meters to corner 45, a point marked F. Z. 1126/74, identical to corner 191, alienable and disposable block I, Bukidnon project No. 9; thence N. 54° E., 510 meters to corner 46, a ponao tree, 30 cm. in diameter, marked F. Z. 1126/71, identical to corner 190, alienable and disposable block I, Bukidnon project No. 9; thence N. 87° E., 330 meters to corner 47, an anonang tree, 30 cm. in diameter, marked F. Z. 1126/70, identical to corner 189, alienable and disposable block I, Bukidnon project No. 9; thence N. 56° E., 270 meters to corner 48, a lupacan tree, 30 cm. in diameter, marked F. Z. 1126/68, identical to corner 188, alienable and disposable block 1, Bukid-non project No. 9; thence N. 74° E., 380 meters to corner 49, a white lauan tree, 40 cm. in diameter, marked F. Z. 1126/66, identical to corner 187, alienable and disposable block I, Bukidnon project No. 9; thence N. 84° E., 240 meters to corner 50, a molave tree, 40 cm. in diameter, marked F. Z. 1126/64, identical to corner 186, alienable and disposable block I, Bukidnon project No. 9; thence S. 61° E., 390 meters to corner 51, a lanete tree, 40 cm. in diameter, marked F. Z. 1126/61, identical to corner 185, alienable and disposable block I, Bukidnon project No. 9; thence S. 79° E., 300 meters to corner 52, a white lauan tree, 45 cm. in diameter, marked F. Z. 1126/58, identical to corner 184, alienable and disposable block I, Bukidnon project No. 9; thence S. 86° E., 300 meters to corner 53, a molave tree, 100 cm. in diameter, marked F. Z. 1126/56, identical to corner 183, alienable and disposable block I, Bukidnon project No. 9; thence S. 4° W., 300 meters to corner 54, a molave tree, 70 cm. in diameter, marked F. Z. 1126/51, identical to corner 182, alienable and disposable block I, Bukidnon project No. 9; thence S. 59’° E., 270 meters to corner 55, a tuai tree, 90 cm. in diameter, marked F. Z. 1126/50, identical to corner 181, alienable and disposable block I, Bukidnon project No. 9; thence N. 64° E., 300 meters to corner 56, a molave tree, 30 cm. in diameter, marked F. Z. 1126/47, identical to corner 180, alienable and disposable block I, Bukidnon project No. 9; thence N. 66° E., 270 meters to corner 57, a molave tree, 50 cm. in diameter, marked F. Z. 1126/44, identical to corner 179, alienable and disposable block I, Bukidnon project No. 9; thence N. 7° E., 390 meters to corner 58, a binayuyo tree, 20 cm. in diameter, marked F. Z. 1126/39, identical to corner 178, alienable and disposable block I, Bukidnon project No. 9; thence N. 26° E., 510 meters to corner 59, a white lauan tree, 50 cm. in diameter, marked F. Z. 1126/37, identical to corner 177, alienable and disposable block I, Bukidnon project No. 9; thence N. 33° E., 480 meters to corner 60, a biwan tree, 40 cm. in diameter, marked F. Z. 1126/36, identical to corner 176, alienable and disposable block I, Bukidnon project No. 9; thence N. 3° E., 510 meters to corner 61, a balacat tree, 35 cm. in diameter, marked F. Z. 1126/33, identical to corner 175, alienable and disposable block I, Bukidnon project No. 9; thence N. 10° E., 360 meters to corner 62, an ata-ata tree, 30 cm. in diameter, marked F. Z. 1126/32, identical to corner 174, alienable and disposable block I, Bukidnon project No. 9; thence N. 25° E., 450 meters to corner 63, -a lumbayao tree, 45 cm. in diameter, marked F. Z. 1126/31, identical to corner 173, alienable and disposable block I, Bukidnon project No. 9; thence N. 29° E., 330 meters to corner 64, a white lauan tree, 60 cm. in diameter, marked F. Z. 1126/29, identical to corner 172, alienable and disposable block I, Bukidnon project No. 9; thence following Sinanguyan Creek downstream in southeasterly and northeasterly directions about 900 meters to corner 65, a bulala tree, 35 cm. in diameter, marked N. P. 47/25, on west bank of junction of creek and River; thence following Maramag River downstream, in general southeasterly, northerly and northeasterly directions, about 3,180 meters to corner 66, a narra tree, 30 cm. in diameter, marked N. P. 44/46, on southwest bank of junction of rivers; thence following Pulangi River downstream, in a general southeasterly direction, about 2,020 meters to corner 67, a guisok tree, 30 cm. in diameter, marked N. P. 44/24, on west bank of Pulangi River; thence following Pulangi River downstream in a general southeasterly direction about 510 meters to corner 68, a white lauan tree, 50 cm. in diameter, marked N. P. 45/12, on west bank of Pulangi River; thence following Pulangi River, downstream in a general southerly direction, about 400 meters to corner 69, a malabunga tree, 30 cm. in diameter, marked N. P. 46/15, on west bank of Pulangi River; thence following Pulangi River downstream in a general southeasterly direction, about 560 meters to corner 70, an amugis tree, 60 cm. in diameter, marked N. P. 48/14, on west bank of Pulangi River; thence following Pulangi River in a general southwesterly direction, about 780 meters to corner 71, a Terminalia specie tree, 50 cm. in diameter, marked N. P. 50/16, on west bank of Pulangi River; thence following Pulangi River downstream in a general southeasterly direction, about 480 meters to corner 72, a white lauan tree, 50 cm. in diameter, marked N. P. 49/11, on west bank of Pulangi River; thence following Pulangi River downstream in a general southwesterly direction about 900 meters to corner 73, a miscellaneous specie tree, 30 cm. in diameter, marked N. P. 52/15, on west bank of Pulangi River; thence following Pulangi River downstream in a general southeasterly direction, about 1,060 meters to corner 74, a malapapaya tree, 20 cm. in diameter, marked N. P. 51/17, on west bank of Pulangi River; thence following Pulangi River downstream in a general southwesterly direction, about 560 meters to corner 75, a maga-buyo tree, 70 cm. in diameter, marked N. P. 58/11, on west bank of Pulangi River; thence following Pulangi River downstream in a general southwesterly direction, about 390 meters to corner 76, a Eugenia specie tree, 25 cm. in diameter, marked N. P. 57/19, on west bank of Pulangi River; thence following Pulangi River downstream in a general southerly and southeasterly directions, about 1,700 meters to corner 77, a macaasim tree, 25 cm. in diameter, marked N. P. 62/29, on west bank of Pulangi River; thence following Pulangi River downstream in a general southwesterly direction, about 880 meters to corner 78, an amugis tree, 40 cm. in diameter, marked N. P. 62/12, on west bank of Pulangi River; thence following Pulangi River downstream in southerly and southeasterly directions, about 900 meters to corner 79, an anilao tree, 40 cm. in diameter, marked N. P. 64/28, on west bank of Pulangi River; thence following Pulangi River downstream in general southwesterly and southerly directions, about 1,000 meters to corner 80, a mayapis tree, 50 cm. in diameter, marked N. P. 65/16, on west bank of Pulangi River; thence following Pulangi River downstream in general southerly and southeasterly directions, about 1,050 meters to corner 81, a balobo tree, 30 cm. in diameter, marked N. P. 74/19, on west bank of Pulangi River; thence following Pulangi River downstream in general southerly and southwesterly directions, about 740 meters to corner 82, a Terminalia specie, tree, 40 cm. in diameter marked N. P. 75/14, on west bank of Pulangi River; thence following Pulangi River, downstream in general southerly and southeasterly directions, about 580 meters to corner 83, an amugis tree, 60 cm. in diameter, marked N. P. 76/16 on west bank of Pulangi River; thence following Pulangi River downstream in a general southeasterly direction, about 360 meters to corner 84, a Sterculia specie tree, 40 cm. in diameter, marked N. P. 68/66, on west bank of Pulangi River; thence N. 83° W., 430 meters to corner 85, a paguringon tree, 40 cm. in diameter, marked N. P. 68/60, on south side of trail; thence N. 88° W., 580 meters to corner 86, a white lauan tree, 40 cm. in diameter, marked N. P. 68/52, on north side of trail; thence N. 82° W., 690 meters to corner 87, an alupag tree, 35 cm. in diameter, marked N. P. 68/44, on north side of trail; thence N. 78° W., 510 meters to corner 88, a white lauan tree, 40 cm. in diameter, marked P. R. 68/39, identical to corner 6, of Cn. F. parcel II, of Kibawe, Bukidnon; thence N. 63 W., 580 meters to corner 89, an apanang tree, 35 cm. in diameter, marked F. E. 68/34, identical to corner 5, of Cn. F. parcel II, of Kibawe, Bukidnon; thence N. 73° W., 310 meters to corner 90, a miscellaneous specie tree, 25 cm. in diameter, marked F. R. 68/31, identical to corner 4, of Cn-F. parcel II, of Kibawe, Bukidnon; thence N. 11° W., 130 meters to corner 91, a bolongeta tree, 20 cm. in diameter, marked F. R. 68/30, identical to corner 3, of Cn. F. parcel II, of Kibawe, Bukidnon; thence N. 51° W., 230 meters to corner 92, a miscellaneous specie tree, 20 cm. in diameter, marked F. R. 68/28, identical to corner 2, of Cn. F. parcel II, of Kibawe, Bukidnon; thence N. 15° N., 200 meters to corner 93, a white lauan tree, 25 cm. in diameter, marked F. Z. 2547/39, identical to corner 76, alienable and disposable Bukidnon project No. 9-A; thence N. 30° W., 470 meters to corner 94, an unknown tree, 20 cm. in diameter, marked F. Z. 2547/47, identical to corner 75, alienable and disposable Bukidnon project No. 9-A; thence N. 65° W., 200 meters to corner 95, a Eugenia specie tree, 25 cm. in diameter, marked F. Z. 2547/49, identical to corner 74, alienable and disposable Bukidnon project No. 9-A; thence N. 83° W., 130 meters to corner 96, a white lauan tree, 50 cm. in diameter, marked F. Z. 2547/51, identical to corner 73, alienable and disposable Bukidnon project No. 9-A; thence N. 44° W., 300 meters to corner 1, the point of beginning.

Corners 1 to 24 were marked with the official marking B. F. hatchet No. 13; corners 25 to 39, 70, 72, 78, and 83 were marked with B. F. hatchet No. 583; corners 40 to 64 were marked with B. F. hatchet No. 167; corners 65, 80 to 81 and 84 to 92 were marked with B. F. hatchet No. 505; corner 66 to 69, 71, 74 to 77, 82 and 93 to 96 were marked with B. F. hatchet No. 585; and corners 73 and 79 were marked with B. F. hatchet No. 151.

Containing an area of approximately 3,836 hectares.

In witness whereof, I have hereunto set my hand and caused the seal of the Commonwealth of the Philippines to be affixed.

Done at the City of Manila, February 11, 1939, and of the Commonwealth of the Philippines, the fourth.

MANUEL L. QUEZON President of the Philippines

By the President:

JORGE B. VARGAS Secretary to the President
