= Rogelio Neil Roque =

Filipino politician (born 1969)

Governor of Bukidnon
- Incumbent
- Assumed office June 30, 2022
- Vice Governor: Clive Quiño
- Preceded by: Jose Maria Zubiri Jr.

Member of the Philippine House of Representatives from Bukidnon's 4th District
- In office June 30, 2013 – June 30, 2022
- Preceded by: Position created
- Succeeded by: Laarni Lavin-Roque

Personal details
- Born: July 25, 1969 (age 57) Valencia City, Bukidnon, Philippines
- Party: PFP (2023–present)
- Other political affiliations: PRP (2021–2023); Nacionalista (2012–2021); NPC (2009–2012)
- Spouse: Laarni Lavin
- Occupation: Politician

Rogelio Neil "Oneil" Pepito Roque (born July 25, 1969) is a Filipino politician who is the incumbent governor of the province of Bukidnon.

== Career ==
Roque hails from the city of Valencia, Bukidnon, serving as councilor from 2010 to 2013. In 2013, he was elected as representative of Bukidnon's fourth district in the House of Representatives. He would be reelected for two more consecutive terms in 2016 and 2019.

He successfully ran for governor of Bukidnon for the 2022 election where the successor of outgoing governor Jose Maria Zubiri Jr. was to be determined. He ran under the Nacionalista Party. Roque's rival was governor Zubiri's son and third district representative Manuel Zubiri.

As governor, Roque vetoed the passage of an indigenous people's code being proposed in the provincial board in August 2024, which led to criticism by the Provincial Tribal Council and threats by the leaders of Bukidnon's seven major tribes to have him declared persona non grata in their domains.

== Personal life ==
Roque is married to Laarni Roque who is also a politician.

Political offices
Preceded by Jose Maria Zubiri Jr.	Governor of Bukidnon; 2022–present	Incumbent
House of Representatives of the Philippines
New title	Member of the House of Representatives from Bukidnon's 4th district 2013–2022	Succeeded by Laarni Roque
