= Don Carlos, Bukidnon =

Municipality in the Philippines

Don Carlos
- Municipality
- Municipality of Don Carlos
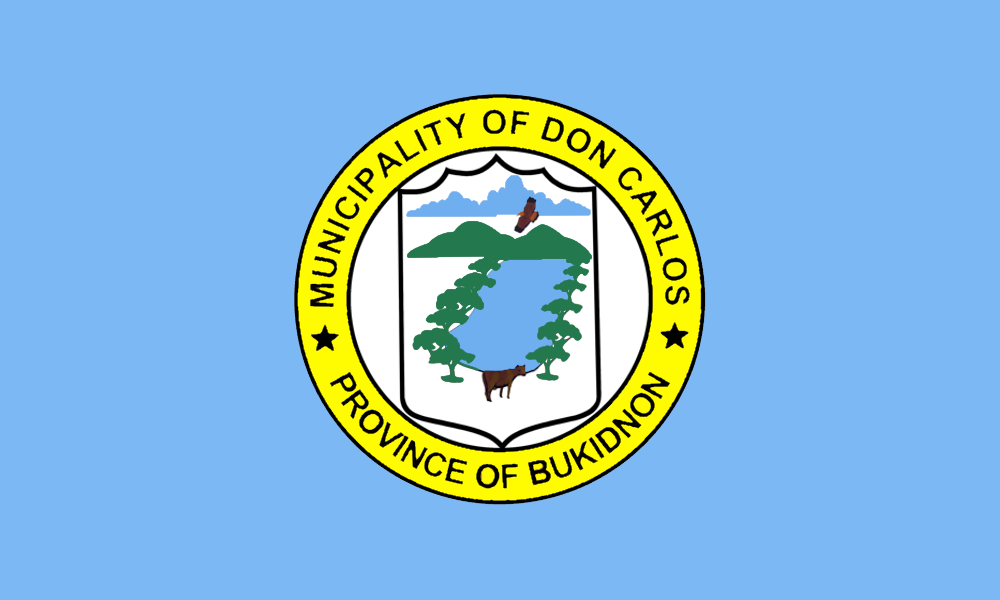
- Flag Seal
- Nickname: Little Vigan of Bukidnon
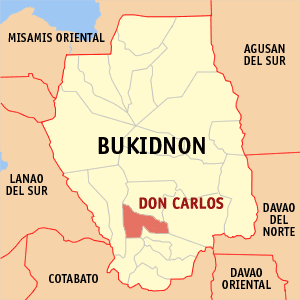
- Map of Bukidnon with Don Carlos highlighted
- Interactive map of Don Carlos
- Location within the Philippines
- Coordinates: 7°40′51″N 124°59′43″E
- Country: Philippines
- Region: Northern Mindanao
- Province: Bukidnon
- District: 3rd district
- Founded: June 18, 1966
- Named for: Don Carlos Azcona Fortich
- Barangays: 29 (see Barangays)

Government
  - Type: Sangguniang Bayan
  - Mayor: Ma. Victoria O. Pizarro
  - Vice Mayor: Jude D. Palmada
  - Representative: Audrey Tan-Zubiri
  - Municipal Council: Members: Wilhelmino O. Abrena Jr.; Chloe Rey L. Mateo; Keith Anthony L. Kotico; Predesbendo B. Gaid; Tyrone Paul L. Agreda; Segundo D. Absuelo Jr.; Marivic R. Montesclaros; Jame Poe M. Campoamor
  - Electorate: 46,120 voters (2025)

Area
  - Total: 213.72 km^{2} (82.52 sq mi)
- Elevation: 300 m (980 ft)
- Highest elevation: 406 m (1,332 ft)
- Lowest elevation: 178 m (584 ft)

Population (2024 census)
  - Total: 73,592
  - Density: 344.34/km^{2} (891.83/sq mi)
  - Households: 16,097

Economy
  - Income class: 1st municipal income class
  - Poverty incidence: 24.97% (2023)
  - Revenue: ₱ 435.4 million (2024)
  - Assets: ₱ 1,312 million (2024)
  - Expenditure: ₱ 357.4 million (2024)
  - Liabilities: ₱ 276.2 million (2024)

Service provider
  - Electricity: First Bukidnon Electric Cooperative (FIBECO)
- Time zone: UTC+8 (PST)
- ZIP code: 8712
- PSGC: 1001304000
- IDD : area code: +63 (0)88
- Native languages: Western Bukidnon Manobo; Binukid; Cebuano; Ata Manobo; Tagalog
- Website: www.doncarlos.gov.ph

Don Carlos, officially the Municipality of Don Carlos (Cebuano: Lungsod sa Don Carlos; Tagalog: Bayan ng Don Carlos), is a municipality in the province of Bukidnon, Philippines. According to the 2024 census, it has a population of 73,592 people.

== History ==
The first people who settled this place before was a certain Datu Andarol, his wife Ba-e Mahanu, and their son Datu ‘Mangginayun’. Datu Andarol was a ruler and the leader of the Manobo tribe settling the village of Minduso, which was the old name of Don Carlos. The place was covered with forests and access by outlanders was prohibited unless permitted by the datu. Minduso was the home of Datu Andarol's descendants. Upon the arrival of the Spaniards, the datu was succeeded by his son, Datu Mangginayun. With their contacts with the Spaniards and missionaries, Spanish naming conventions and Christianity was introduced, and Datu Mangginayun adopted the name "Antonio", hence his full name was now Datu ‘Mangginayun’ Antonio Sagandilan Sr. He was married to Ba-e Antonina Manlayuan. His leadership reflects that of his father, as he implemented tribal laws and settled criminal offenses, particularly murder. As the leader of his tribal community, he also presided wedding ceremonies and settled dowries.

The first popular Spanish stranger who approached Datu ‘Mangginayun’ Antonio Sr. was Tomás Sandoval. He requested a parcel of land that he intend to borrow and to till, the datu conceded to his request. As part of the agreement, Tomás was to give the part of his harvest as a share to the datu. Several years later, another Spaniard by the name of "Elizalde" came and, like Tomás, requested the datu for lands to establish ranches. The lands lent by the datu to Elizalde were: lands in Pantil-pantilan, Migtutugop, the lands along the Mulita river, the today-famous Squash Mountain, and the Tugas Falls. As the agricultural ventures of these two Spaniards flourished, Cebuanos (referred by the Lumads, or natives, as "Dumagats") and other Spaniards who came from Cagayan de Misamis and other coastal towns of Misamis were encouraged to settle and populate the area that comprises the present-day Don Carlos.

Census registry for the settlers of Minduso was only located at Ramag (Manobo for ‘breakfast’), which has a fully established local government facilities and would later be known as Maramag. Antonio Sr.'s son, Datu ‘Mangginayun’ Antonio Sagandilan Jr. was born on March 17, 1917, at Miuvan (now Barangay Sinangguyan) and had his birth registered at Maramag. Antonio Jr. was drafted into the USAFFE before World War II and completed his training with the rank of corporal. However, he was called upon to fight on the outbreak of war, and his family did nothing about it.

When the war ended, Antonio Jr. succeeded his father in the leadership of his tribe as a datu in 1946. He was first a tribal councilor, and later became a barangay captain of the whole of Minduso. During his time of service, Señora Remedios ‘Meding’ Fortich de Ozamiz personally visited Antonio Jr. and she petitioned the name change of Miuvan (which is now Barangay Sinangguyan) to ‘Don Carlos’ in her husband's memory, Don Carlos Azcona Fortich, and as a gratitude for living in the land which the Sagandilans flourished. At first, the datu declined, as the flourishing enclave has significance for their patrimony. Eventually, under Republic Act No. 4800, Minduso and other neighboring villages and barangays were clustered to form the municipality of Don Carlos in 1966.

Political Background

The political history of Don Carlos, Bukidnon is marked by its evolution from a remote settlement into a recognized municipality. Initially, the area was part of extensive cattle ranches owned by prominent families such as the Elizaldes, Guingonas, and Roceses before World War II. With the country's independence in 1946, significant changes began to shape the region’s political landscape.

The relocation of the Bukidnon Lumber Company, jointly owned by Howard Denison and the Fortich family, to a site near Lake Pinamaloy marked the beginning of increased settlement in the area. The sawmill attracted a steady stream of immigrants seeking opportunities as workers, merchants, and farmers. The establishment of makeshift housing near the sawmill led to the formation of a community. Due to the challenging road conditions, characterized by knee-deep mud, the area was aptly named "Menduso," derived from the Visayan term "duso," meaning "push."

In January 1953, the barrio of Menduso celebrated its inaugural Barrio Fiesta in honor of the Holy Child, later becoming the patron saint of the area. Shortly thereafter, the barrio’s name was changed to Don Carlos in tribute to the late Congressman Carlos Fortich.

The transition to municipality status began with the issuance of Executive Order No. 161 by President Diosdado Macapagal on August 17, 1965. This order officially created the Municipality of Don Carlos, separating it from Maramag. The newly formed municipality included various barrios such as Don Carlos Norte, Don Carlos Sur, Sinangguyan, and several others.

The official recognition of Don Carlos as a municipality was further cemented by Republic Act No. 4800, enacted on June 18, 1966. This legislation delineated the municipality’s boundaries and established its administrative framework. The first general elections for municipal officials were held in 1967, with Honorable Teodolo M. Palma, Sr. serving as the first mayor.

The boundaries of Don Carlos were clearly defined, including northern, southern, eastern, and western limits based on local geographic landmarks and rivers. This structured approach ensured that the new municipality could manage its administrative functions and resources effectively.

The establishment of Don Carlos was characterized by its phased development of barangays. The legal basis for the creation of these barangays involved various national laws and provincial ordinances, reflecting the municipality’s need to accommodate its growing population and administrative requirements.

Don Carlos has since developed a robust political and administrative framework, with a history of dedicated local leadership. The municipality continues to evolve, guided by its foundational legislation and the ongoing commitment of its elected officials.

Executive Order No. 161, issued on August 17, 1965, by President Diosdado Macapagal of the Philippines, delineated the establishment of the municipality of Don Carlos in Bukidnon province, in accordance with Section 68 of the Revised Administrative Code. This executive order delineated various barrios, formerly under Maramag municipality, and constituted them into an autonomous municipality named Don Carlos, with its administrative hub situated in Don Carlos Sur. The order meticulously outlined the territorial boundaries of Don Carlos municipality, which began from a designated point at the junction of Pulangui and Maramag rivers, extending in a northwesterly direction along the Maramag river, and then due west to the east side of Sayre Highway.

== Geography ==
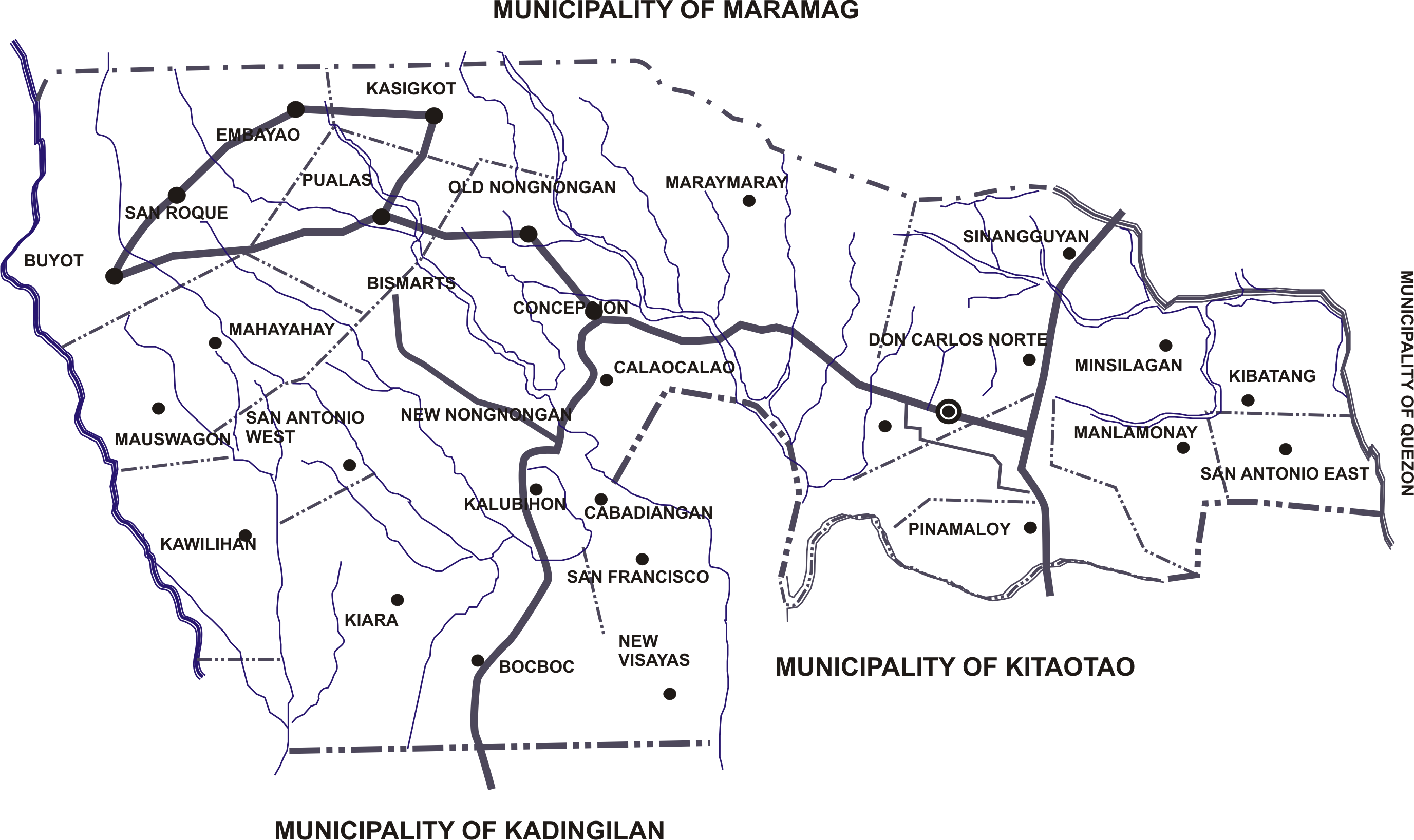
Political map of Don Carlos, showing its 29 barangays

Don Carlos is situated in the southern part of the province. It is located 61 kilometres (38 mi) south of the City of Malaybalay, 161 kilometres (100 mi) from Cagayan de Oro, 180 kilometres (110 mi) from the Cotabato City, 160 kilometres (99 mi) from Davao City, and 1,575 kilometres (979 mi) from south of Manila. The town is bounded by the municipalities of Maramag in the north, Kitaotao in the south, Quezon in the east, Pangantucan and Kadingilan in the west. The town is known for its famous landmark, Lake Pinamaloy.

Geographic Location

Don Carlos is strategically situated in the southern part of Bukidnon’s 3rd District, within the coordinates 7°33′00″ to 7°38′00″ N latitude and 124°53′00″ to 125°57′00″ E longitude. It is bordered by Maramag to the north, Kitaotao to the south, Quezon to the east, and Pangantucan and Kadingilan to the west. The municipality is landlocked and features a diverse terrain of rolling hills, flat agricultural plains, and upland areas. Elevation ranges from 300 to 600 meters above sea level, making it well-suited for highland crop production.

Don Carlos lies 61 kilometers south of Malaybalay City and is regionally accessible from major urban centers such as Cagayan de Oro (161 km), Cotabato (180 km), Davao (160 km), General Santos (266 km), and Manila (1,575 km).

The municipality spans a total land area of 24,035.09 hectares, accounting for roughly 2% of Bukidnon’s total land area, and is politically subdivided into 29 barangays. Approximately 97% of this area is classified as rural, while the remaining 3% comprises the urban core, primarily located in Don Carlos Norte and Don Carlos Sur.

The largest barangay by land area is Maraymaray (3,701.41 hectares), while the smallest is Cabadiangan (208.35 hectares). Other barangays with significant land areas include San Nicolas (1,156.68 ha), San Antonio East (1,154.36 ha), and Sinangguyan (1,305.61 ha).

=== Soil type ===
The Municipality of Don Carlos covers a total agricultural land area of 24,035.13 hectares, distributed across 29 barangays. All soil types within the municipality are classified as suitable for agriculture, supporting the area's strong agrarian economy.

The dominant soil type is Kidapawan clay and Kidapawan clay loam, covering a combined area of approximately 12,020.76 hectares, which accounts for about 50.03% of the municipality’s total land area. This soil type is present in 23 barangays, making it the most widely distributed and utilized for crop production.

Following this is Adtuyon clay, covering 9,569.14 hectares or 39.82% of the total area. It is prominent in upland and rolling terrain barangays such as Maraymaray (with the largest single Adtuyon clay area at 2,413.01 ha), Sinangguyan, and Old Nongnongan.

Macolod clay accounts for 2,123.98 hectares or 8.84%, found primarily in barangays such as Maraymaray, San Nicolas, and Kibatang. This soil type is typically located in hilly areas and is prone to erosion, but suitable for crops like sugarcane and fruit trees.

The least represented soil type is La Castellana clay loam, which occupies only 321.24 hectares or 1.34% of the total area. It is found in small patches in barangays like Embayao and San Roque, and is noted for its good tilth and fertility, ideal for high-value vegetable and fruit crops.

Don Carlos has a diverse soil composition, with a strong dominance of Kidapawan clay types. This variety supports a wide range of agricultural activities across different elevations and terrains, reinforcing the municipality’s status as an agriculturally productive area in Bukidnon.

=== Topography ===
The terrain of the municipality of Don Carlos is generally flat except the mountain range on the eastern part of the municipality. The highest elevation is 700 metres (2,300 ft) above sea level and the lowest elevation is 300 metres (980 ft) below sea level.

=== Slope ===
Flat to gently sloping areas ranging in slope from 0-8% is the most prevalent terrain in the municipality, which covers 198.96 km^{2} (93.09%) of the total land area of the municipality. Moderately sloping to undulating lands ranging in slope from 8-18% occupies approximately 7.65 km^{2}. Rolling to moderately steep lands, sloping from 18 to 30%, covers 4.19 km^{2} of land. Areas with slope above 30% covers 2920.09 km^{2}.

=== Climate ===
The municipality's climate falls under the third type. Climate under this type experiences rainy season in the months of April to September. The latest data from the DA shows that the months July to November registered the highest average annual rainfall that reached its peak in the month of July at 642 millimetres (25.3 in).

Climate data for Don Carlos, Bukidnon
| Month | Jan | Feb | Mar | Apr | May | Jun | Jul | Aug | Sep | Oct | Nov | Dec | Year |
|---|---|---|---|---|---|---|---|---|---|---|---|---|---|
| Mean daily maximum °C (°F) | 28 (82) | 29 (84) | 30 (86) | 31 (88) | 30 (86) | 29 (84) | 29 (84) | 29 (84) | 29 (84) | 29 (84) | 29 (84) | 29 (84) | 29 (85) |
| Mean daily minimum °C (°F) | 20 (68) | 20 (68) | 20 (68) | 21 (70) | 22 (72) | 22 (72) | 22 (72) | 22 (72) | 22 (72) | 22 (72) | 22 (72) | 21 (70) | 21 (71) |
| Average precipitation mm (inches) | 44 (1.7) | 27 (1.1) | 32 (1.3) | 35 (1.4) | 76 (3.0) | 117 (4.6) | 108 (4.3) | 108 (4.3) | 94 (3.7) | 100 (3.9) | 76 (3.0) | 46 (1.8) | 863 (34.1) |
| Average rainy days | 10.3 | 8.1 | 8.5 | 9.6 | 21.0 | 24.9 | 25.0 | 24.2 | 22.5 | 23.4 | 17.7 | 11.4 | 206.6 |
Source: Meteoblue

=== Barangays ===
Don Carlos is politically subdivided into 29 barangays. Each barangay consists of puroks while some have sitios.

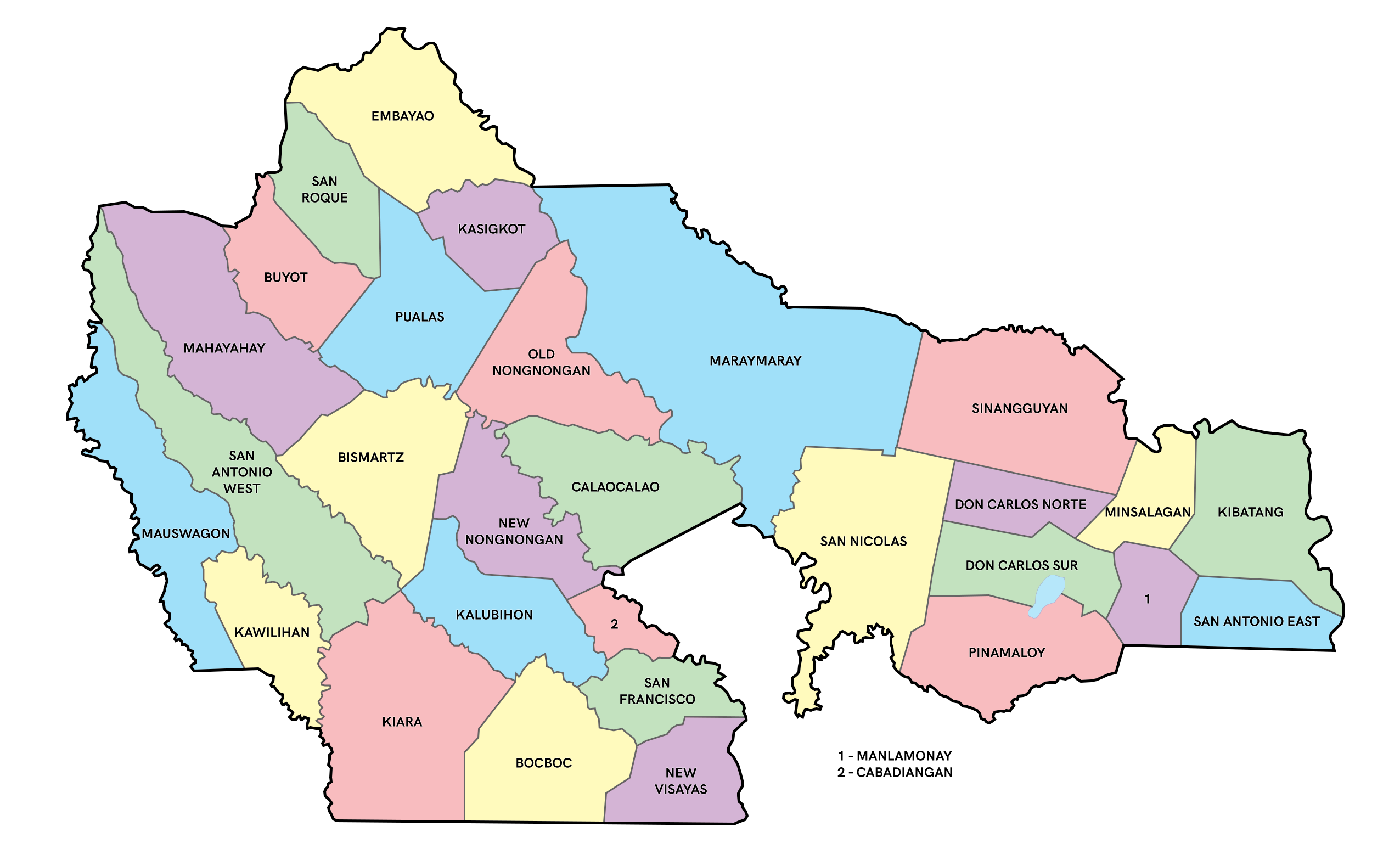
Map of Don Carlos showing its 29 barangays.

| PSGC | Barangay | Population | | | ±% p.a. | |
| | | 2024 | | 2010 | | |
|---|---|---|---|---|---|---|
| 101304001 | Cabadiangan | 0.7% | 497 | 460 | ▴ | 0.54% |
| 101304002 | Bocboc | 3.7% | 2,724 | 2,668 | ▴ | 0.14% |
| 101304003 | Buyot | 1.5% | 1,072 | 1,038 | ▴ | 0.22% |
| 101304004 | Calaocalao | 3.8% | 2,806 | 2,720 | ▴ | 0.22% |
| 101304005 | Don Carlos Norte | 9.1% | 6,718 | 5,889 | ▴ | 0.92% |
| 101304006 | Embayao | 1.6% | 1,154 | 1,099 | ▴ | 0.34% |
| 101304008 | Kalubihon | 1.6% | 1,188 | 1,207 | ▾ | −0.11% |
| 101304009 | Kasigkot | 1.7% | 1,226 | 1,193 | ▴ | 0.19% |
| 101304010 | Kawilihan | 1.4% | 1,058 | 1,053 | ▴ | 0.03% |
| 101304011 | Kiara | 3.8% | 2,793 | 2,684 | ▴ | 0.28% |
| 101304012 | Kibatang | 3.0% | 2,238 | 2,147 | ▴ | 0.29% |
| 101304013 | Mahayahay | 1.3% | 970 | 833 | ▴ | 1.06% |
| 101304014 | Manlamonay | 2.2% | 1,639 | 1,556 | ▴ | 0.36% |
| 101304015 | Maraymaray | 4.2% | 3,112 | 3,593 | ▾ | −0.99% |
| 101304016 | Mauswagon | 1.6% | 1,164 | 1,081 | ▴ | 0.52% |
| 101304017 | Minsalagan | 1.2% | 877 | 817 | ▴ | 0.49% |
| 101304018 | New Nongnongan (Masimag) | 2.7% | 2,001 | 1,909 | ▴ | 0.33% |
| 101304019 | New Visayas | 1.4% | 1,027 | 1,055 | ▾ | −0.19% |
| 101304020 | Old Nongnongan | 2.4% | 1,800 | 1,748 | ▴ | 0.20% |
| 101304021 | Pinamaloy | 3.8% | 2,797 | 2,596 | ▴ | 0.52% |
| 101304022 | Don Carlos Sur (Poblacion) | 15.5% | 11,385 | 11,069 | ▴ | 0.20% |
| 101304023 | Pualas | 3.2% | 2,326 | 2,342 | ▾ | −0.05% |
| 101304024 | San Antonio East | 1.1% | 796 | 820 | ▾ | −0.21% |
| 101304025 | San Antonio West | 2.2% | 1,600 | 1,479 | ▴ | 0.55% |
| 101304026 | San Francisco | 0.8% | 575 | 545 | ▴ | 0.37% |
| 101304027 | San Nicolas (Banban) | 6.7% | 4,949 | 4,438 | ▴ | 0.76% |
| 101304028 | San Roque | 1.0% | 701 | 831 | ▾ | −1.18% |
| 101304029 | Sinangguyan | 5.5% | 4,081 | 3,796 | ▴ | 0.50% |
| 101304030 | Bismartz | 2.3% | 1,685 | 1,668 | ▴ | 0.07% |
| | Total | | 73,592 | 64,334 | ▴ | 0.94% |

== Demographics ==
Population census of Don Carlos
| Year | Pop. | ±% p.a. |
|---|---|---|
| 1970 | 32,668 | — |
| 1975 | 35,252 | +1.54% |
| 1980 | 35,038 | −0.12% |
| 1990 | 45,815 | +2.72% |
| 1995 | 51,083 | +2.06% |
| 2000 | 55,495 | +1.79% |
| 2007 | 60,870 | +1.28% |
| 2010 | 64,334 | +2.03% |
| 2015 | 66,959 | +0.76% |
| 2020 | 69,273 | +0.72% |
| 2024 | 73,592 | +1.46% |
Source: Philippine Statistics Authority

In the 2024 census, the population of Don Carlos was 73,592 people, with a density of 340 inhabitants per square kilometre or 880 inhabitants per square mile.

== Economy ==
Poverty incidence of Don Carlos (%)

Source: Philippine Statistics Authority

=== Commerce and trade ===
As of 2024, the Municipality of Don Carlos, Bukidnon recorded a total of 1,212 business transactions, based on data from the Business Permits and Licensing Office (BPLO). This includes 976 business renewals, 236 new business registrations, and 64 business retirements.

Compared to the year 2000, when the Municipal Treasurer’s Office (MTO) recorded only 350 commercial establishments, the number of businesses operating in the municipality has grown significantly. In 2000, the majority of these establishments were engaged in retailing, merchandising, food and beverage services, catering, and other service-related industries.

This increase in commercial activity over the years reflects the municipality's expanding economic base and the growing role of micro, small, and medium enterprises (MSMEs) in local development.

=== Agriculture ===
Don Carlos is an agricultural municipality. It is endowed with vast tracts of fertile agricultural lands coupled with a favorable climate. Many people in the area are greatly dependent on the produce of the land. Being the main source of income of the municipality, agriculture utilizes about 149.5894 km^{2} of land, representing 70% of the total land area of the municipality for the production of various crops.

In terms of production, in the year 1998, rice yielded 3,156.60 metric tons both in irrigated and rainfed farms. White and yellow corn production accounted to 39,086.10 metric tons covering 66.98 km^{2} representing 11.78% to agricultural area. sugarcane production as second major crop next to corn, covers a physical area of 50 km^{2} representing 33.42% with a total production of 21,000 metric tons.

The cash crops include leafy green vegetables, fruits, legumes and root crops. Coconut, sugarcane, banana, jackfruit, cacao and rubber comprise the commercial crops. Commercial crops cover 24.4194 km^{2} and has a total production 2,523.75 metric tons.

== Tourism ==
The Municipality of Don Carlos is naturally endowed with sites which have been seen with strong potentials to be tourist destinations. These are the uncommercialized Lake Pinamaloy in Barangay Pinamaloy; the Sinangguyan and Kahulugan Waterfalls in Barangay Sinangguyan; and the Linking Caves and Spring in Barangay San Antonio East.

Lake Pinamaloy
Lake Pinamaloy also known as Tourism Lake has an approximate area of 0.6 km^{2}. It is considered as a landmark and tourist attraction, thus a development plan has been prepared and was submitted to the Department of Tourism as a blueprint of the program.

Sinangguyan and Kahulugan Falls
Combined to the other tourism sites of the municipality is the Sinangguyan and Kahulugan falls, which both have the approximate height of 20 to 25 meters.

Linking Caves and Spring
Located in San Antonio East, the Linking Caves and Spring adds tourism boost to the place. Reason enough that a proposal has been made to develop its nature into a swimming pool.

Evidently, these sites are enriched with innate natural physical features. Private sector and government efforts would be done to explore these potentials with extensive promotions in order to draw investors and encourage development and tourists.

== Transportation ==
=== Airport ===
Don Carlos will be the site of the proposed Bukidnon Domestic Airport which will be located at the unused former Maraymaray Airstrip in the municipality's Barangay Maraymaray. The sequestered airstrip was previously owned by the Cojuancos. The Bukidnon Airport Development Project was included in the Department of Transportation's budget for 2018. Funds for the construction and improvement of all road networks leading to the proposed airport have been allocated by the DPWH. Construction of the domestic airport was scheduled in 2018. It will be the fourth domestic airport operating in Northern Mindanao following Laguindingan Airport in Misamis Oriental, Labo Airport in Ozamiz City and Camiguin Airport in Camiguin. Groundbreaking of the said airport was done in May 2018.

The Bukidnon Airport spans an area of 149,000 square meters within its boundaries, with the Passenger Terminal Building (PTB) occupying 3,600 square meters and will be able to accommodate up to 425 passengers. Situated in Barangay Maraymaray, the airport's construction began in 2019 and is scheduled to continue until 2026 as per contractual obligation, with ongoing construction activities.

The airport is owned and operated by the Civil Aviation Authority of the Philippines (CAAP) and will serve as a crucial transportation hub for the Province of Bukidnon. Its runway specifications include:

Phase I: 1260 meters x 30 meters

Phase III: 1560 meters x 30 meters

Phase IV: 2100 meters x 45 meters

The Civil Aviation Authority of the Philippines cannot specify the destinations Bukidnon Airport will serve, as this depends on which airlines choose to operate in the said airport.
