= Governor of Bukidnon =

Local chief executive

Provincial Governor of Bukidnon
- Incumbent; Rogelio Neil P. Roque since June 30, 2022
- Appointer: Elected via popular vote
- Term length: 3 years
- Inaugural holder: Manuel Fortich
- Formation: 1917

The governor of Bukidnon (Filipino: Punong Panlalawigan ng Bukidnon), is the chief executive of the provincial government of Bukidnon, Philippines.

== Provincial Governors ==
No.	Image	Governor	Term
1		Marcus A. Reciña	1953-1959
2		Lope R. Damasco	1960-1963
3		Teodoro L. Oblad	1964-1967
4		Carlos Fortich	1968-1976
5		Angelo T. Lopez	1976-1979
6		Timoteo C. Ocaya	1979-1980
(4)		Carlos Fortich	1980-1987
7		Esmeraldo Cudal	1987-1988
8		Ernesto Tabios	1988-1992
(4)		Carlos Fortich	1992-2001
-		Nemesio Beltran	2001
9		Jose Maria Zubiri Jr.	2001-2010
10		Alex P. Calingasan	2010-2013
(9)		Jose Maria Zubiri Jr.	2013-2022
11		Rogelio Neil Roque	2022-present
