= Bukidnon Paglaum =

Bukidnon Paglaum Party
- Chairman: Jose Ma. R. Zubiri, Jr.
- Founded: 2012
- Headquarters: Maramag, Bukidnon
- Ideology: Localism
- House of Representatives: 2 / 4 (Bukidnon seats only)
- Provincial governors: 0 / 1
- Provincial vice governors: 1 / 1
- Provincial board members: 8 / 14

Bukidnon Paglaum Party (BPP) (transl. "Hope for Bukidnon Party"), or simply Bukidnon Paglaum, is a local political party in Bukidnon, Philippines. It was created and founded by Jose Ma. R. Zubiri, Jr., who also stands as the party's chairman.

On 2012, it forged an alliance with the Liberal Party for the local elections in the province. The party was conditionally approved by the Commission on Elections in November 2012.

Despite the similarity in names, Bukidnon Paglaum Party is not related to the older Negros Occidental Paglaum Party.

== Notable members ==
- Migz Zubiri – Senator
- Jose Maria Zubiri, Jr. – Governor of Bukidnon
- Alex Calingasan – Vice-Governor of Bukidnon
- Jose Zubiri III – Representative of the third legislative district of Bukidnon
- Maria Lourdes Acosta-Alba - Representative of Bukidnon's 1st congressional district
- Jose Manuel Alba - Representative of Bukidnon's 1st congressional district

== Elections participated ==
- 2013 Bukidnon local elections
  - 2013 Valencia (Bukidnon) local elections
