= Laarni Roque =

Filipino politician

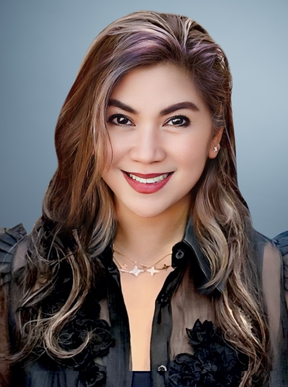
- Official portrait, 2025

Member of the House of Representatives of the Philippines from Bukidnon's 4th District
- Incumbent
- Assumed office June 30, 2022
- Preceded by: Rogelio Neil Roque

Member of the Valencia City Council
- In office June 30, 2019 – June 30, 2022

Personal details
- Born: Laarni Lavin; September 18, 1971 (age 55) Mandaluyong, Rizal, Philippines
- Party: Nacionalista
- Spouse: Rogelio Neil Roque

Laarni Lavin Roque (born September 18, 1971) is a Filipino politician who was a member of the House of Representatives. She represents Bukidnon's 4th congressional district. She was born on September 18, 1971, with six siblings. She became a representative in 2022 and was re-elected in 2025.

== Early life ==
She was born in Mandaluyong on September 18, 1971, with six siblings. Her father was a college graduate who became a banker, while her mother was a nurse. Three of her siblings were doctors, one was an architect, and one was an engineer. She pursued law at the De La Salle University. After she graduated, she married. Then, she gained another bachelor's degree in education. She then passed the board exams, and moved to Mindanao, where her husband lives.

== 2022 elections ==
She ran for the 4th congressional district of Bukidnon under the Nacionalista Party. She was elected as a representative for the district of Bukidnon in the 2022 Philippine House of Representatives elections, beating Atty. Babba Garcia of the Bangon Pilipinas Party. She gained 95,837 votes, 67.10 percent of the votes.

== 2025 elections ==
She ran for a second term in the fourth district of Bukidnon under the Nacionalista Party. She ran against two independents. She gained 76,663 votes, 7.70 percent of the votes. She beat one of her opponents by a slight margin of one percent.

In the 20th Congress of the Philippines, she is chair of the Philippine House Committee on Civil Service and Professional Regulation.

== Personal life ==
Roque is the mother of a child on the autism spectrum.

== See also ==
- List of female members of the House of Representatives of the Philippines

House of Representatives of the Philippines
Preceded by Rogelio Neil Roque	Member of the House of Representatives from Bukidnon's 4th district 2022–present	Incumbent
