= Jose Maria Zubiri Jr. =

Filipino businessman

José María R. Zubiri Jr.
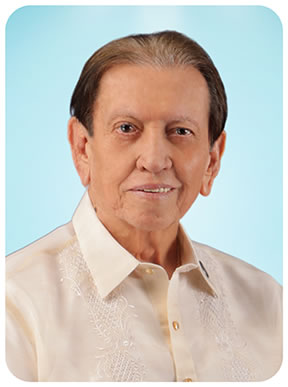
- Official portrait, 2022

Member of the Philippine House of Representatives from Bukidnon's 3rd District
- In office June 30, 2022 – June 30, 2025
- Preceded by: Manuel F. Zubiri
- Succeeded by: Audrey Zubiri
- In office June 30, 1987 – June 30, 1998
- Preceded by: Position established
- Succeeded by: Migz Zubiri

Governor of Bukidnon
- In office June 30, 2013 – June 30, 2022
- Vice Governor: Alex Calingasan (2013–2016, 2017–2018); Rogelio Quiño (2016–2017, 2018–2022)
- Preceded by: Alex Calingasan
- Succeeded by: Rogelio Neil Roque
- In office June 30, 2001 – June 30, 2010
- Vice Governor: Alex Calingasan
- Preceded by: Nemesio Beltran
- Succeeded by: Alex Calingasan

Vice Governor of Bukidnon
- In office June 30, 2010 – June 30, 2013
- Governor: Alex Calingasan
- Preceded by: Alex Calingasan
- Succeeded by: Alex Calingasan

Mambabatas Pambansa (Assemblyman) from Bukidnon
- In office July 23, 1984 – March 25, 1986 Serving with Lorenzo Dinlayan

Personal details
- Born: José María Zubiri Jr. y Rubín; August 14, 1940 (age 86) Kabankalan, Negros Occidental, Philippine Commonwealth
- Party: PFP (2024–present); Bukidnon Paglaum (local party; 2012–present)
- Other political affiliations: Lakas (1998–2012); NPC (1992–1998); Liberal (1987–1992); KBL (1984–1987)
- Children: Jose Maria III; Manuel Antonio; Juan Miguel; Beatrice; Stephanie
- Education: De La Salle University (BS)
- Occupation: Politician
- Profession: Businessperson
- Nickname: "Nonoy Joe Zubiri"

José María Rubín Zubiri Jr. (born August 14, 1940), more commonly known simply as Jose Ma. Zubiri Jr. or Jose Zubiri Jr., is a Filipino businessman and politician who served as representative of Bukidnon's 3rd congressional district in the Northern Mindanao region of the Philippines, a post he previously held three times. He was also the governor of the same province from 2001 to 2010 and from 2013 to 2022 and vice governor from 2010 to 2013.

== Early life and education ==
Zubiri was born on August 11, 1940, in Kabankalan, Negros Occidental to Jose Zubiri Sr. and Rosa Rubin and raised in Barangay Talubangi. He spent his elementary years at Kabankalan Elementary School and finished his secondary education at La Salle College-Bacolod (now University of St. La Salle) in Bacolod. He was a graduate of Bachelor of Science in Management at De La Salle University in Manila. His family is of Basque and Castilian heritage.

Aside from his native Hiligaynon, Zubiri is also fluent in Cebuano, Tagalog and English.

== Business career ==
Before Zubiri entered politics, he worked as an employee for different business firms. He moved to Bukidnon and was an Executive Vice President of the Bukidnon Sugar Milling Company (BUSCO). He was also the chairman of Valle Escondida Farms from 1979 to 1988 and the president of Rancho Mercedes Inc. from 1983 to 1988. Currently, aside from being governor, he still is the president of the following corporations:

- Urban Green Inc.
- Services Cleaners Inc.
- SGABI
- Sugarcane Farmers of Bukidnon Multi-Purpose Cooperative

== Politics ==
Zubiri's political career began by becoming an Assemblyman in Batasang Pambansa from 1984 to 1986. He served as a Representative of the third district of Bukidnon for three consecutive terms, from 1987 to 1998. In 2001, he won as Governor and served three consecutive terms until 2010. He then ran and won as vice governor, serving one term until 2013. He then again ran for governor in the 2013 elections and won, serving three consecutive terms until 2022. He was reelected back to the Congress, representing the third district of Bukidnon once again, in 2022. He opted not to seek re-election and his second congressional stint ended in 2025.

== Personal life ==
Zubiri is married to socialite Maria Victoria "Vicky" Fernandez who was born in Libon, Albay but raised in Bukidnon.

They have five children: Jose Maria III, a former Representative of the third district of Bukidnon; Manuel Antonio, another former Representative of the third district of Bukidnon; Juan Miguel, a former Senate President; Beatrice; and Stephanie, a columnist and television host. Zubiri's nephew includes former Malaybalay City Mayor Ignacio "Iñaki" W. Zubiri.

House of Representatives of the Philippines
Preceded by Manuel Zubiri	Member of the House of Representatives from Bukidnon's 3rd district 2022–2025; 1987–1998	Succeeded by Audrey Zubiri
New title	Member of the House of Representatives from Bukidnon's 3rd district 2022–2025; 1987–1998	Succeeded by Migz Zubiri
Political offices
Preceded by Alex Calingasan	Governor of Bukidnon; 2013–2022; 2001–2010	Succeeded by Rogelio Neil Roque
Preceded by Carlos Fortich	Governor of Bukidnon; 2013–2022; 2001–2010	Succeeded by Alex Calingasan
Preceded by Alex Calingasan	Vice Governor of Bukidnon; 2010–2013	Succeeded by Alex Calingasan
