= Lake Apo =

Crater lake in Bukidnon, Philippines

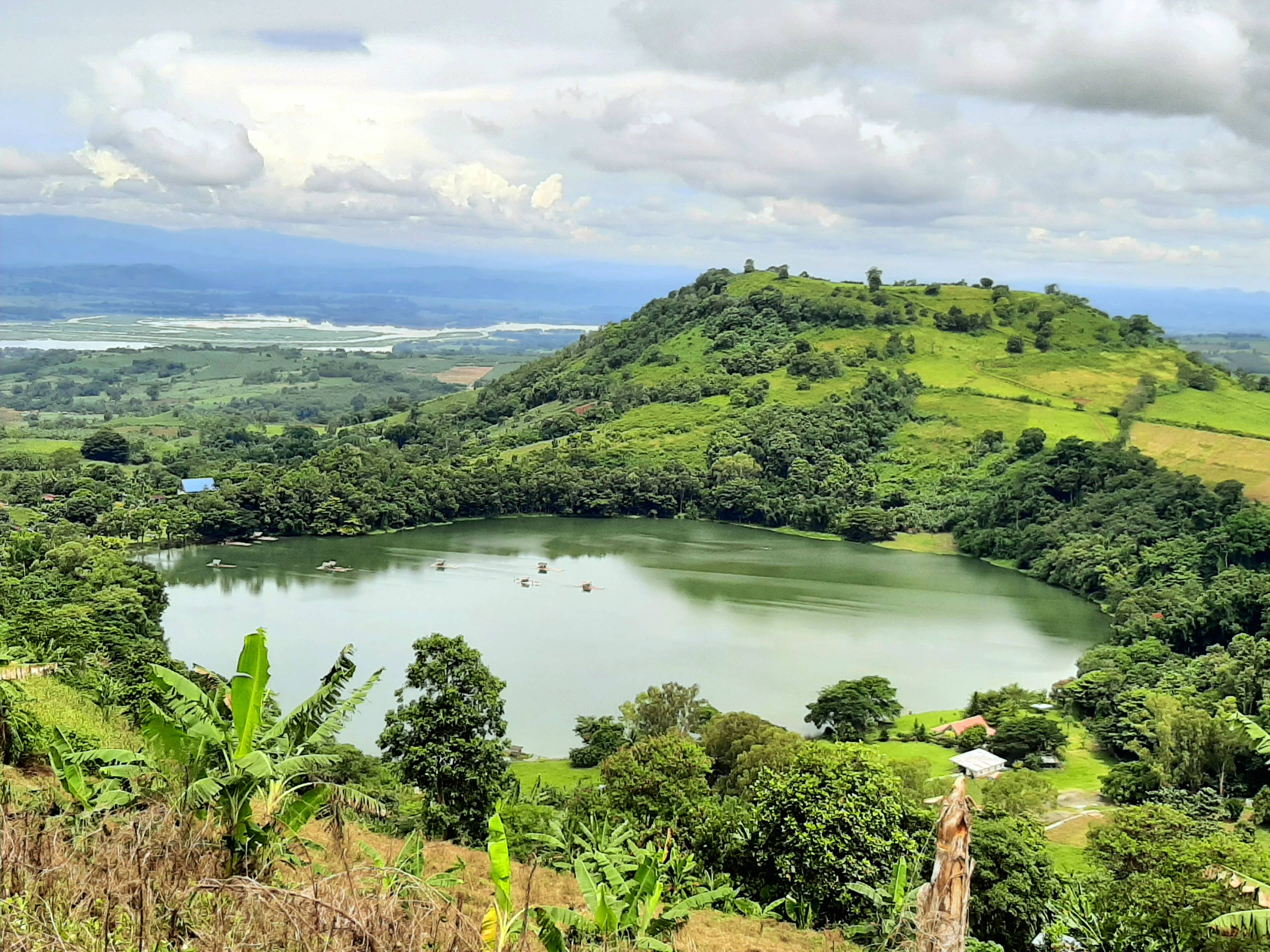
- Lake Apo from an overlooking ridge in Valencia, Bukidnon.

- Location within the Philippines
- Location: Bukidnon
- Coordinates: 7°52′49″N 125°0′22″E
- Type: Crater lake
- Basin countries: Philippines
- Surface area: 24 ha (0.24 km^{2})
- Average depth: 17 m (55.77 ft)
- Max. depth: 26 m (85.30 ft)
- Surface elevation: 640 m (2,099.74 ft)
- Settlements: Valencia

Lake Apo is a crater lake in Barangay Guinoyoran in the city of Valencia in Bukidnon province in the Philippines. It is located in a hilly area about 640 metres (2,100 ft) in elevation, about 11 kilometres (6.8 mi) WSW of the city poblacion (town center). Lake Apo was awarded the cleanest inland body of water in Northern Mindanao Region (Region X) in the late 1990s. The green body of water has an estimated area of 24 hectares (59 acres) with maximum depths reaching up to 26 m (85 ft).

== Etymology ==
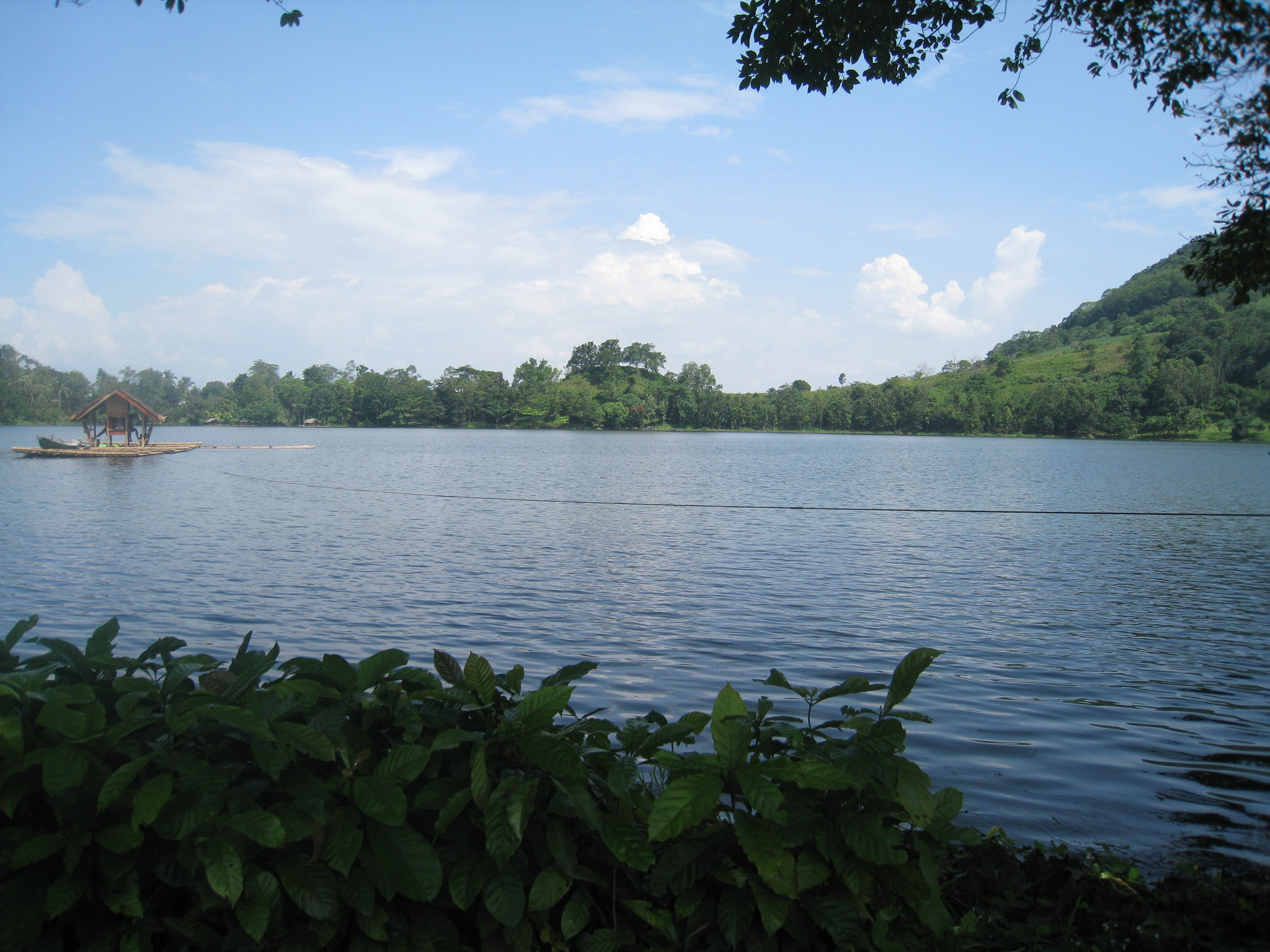
Raft cottages at Lake Apo

The name of the lake come from the bisaya term apo, meaning elder or grandparent. According to legend, there was a man living in the mountains who assaulted his granddaughter and was punished by the mountain deities for his disrespectful act by flooding the area forming the Lake Apo.

== Geology ==
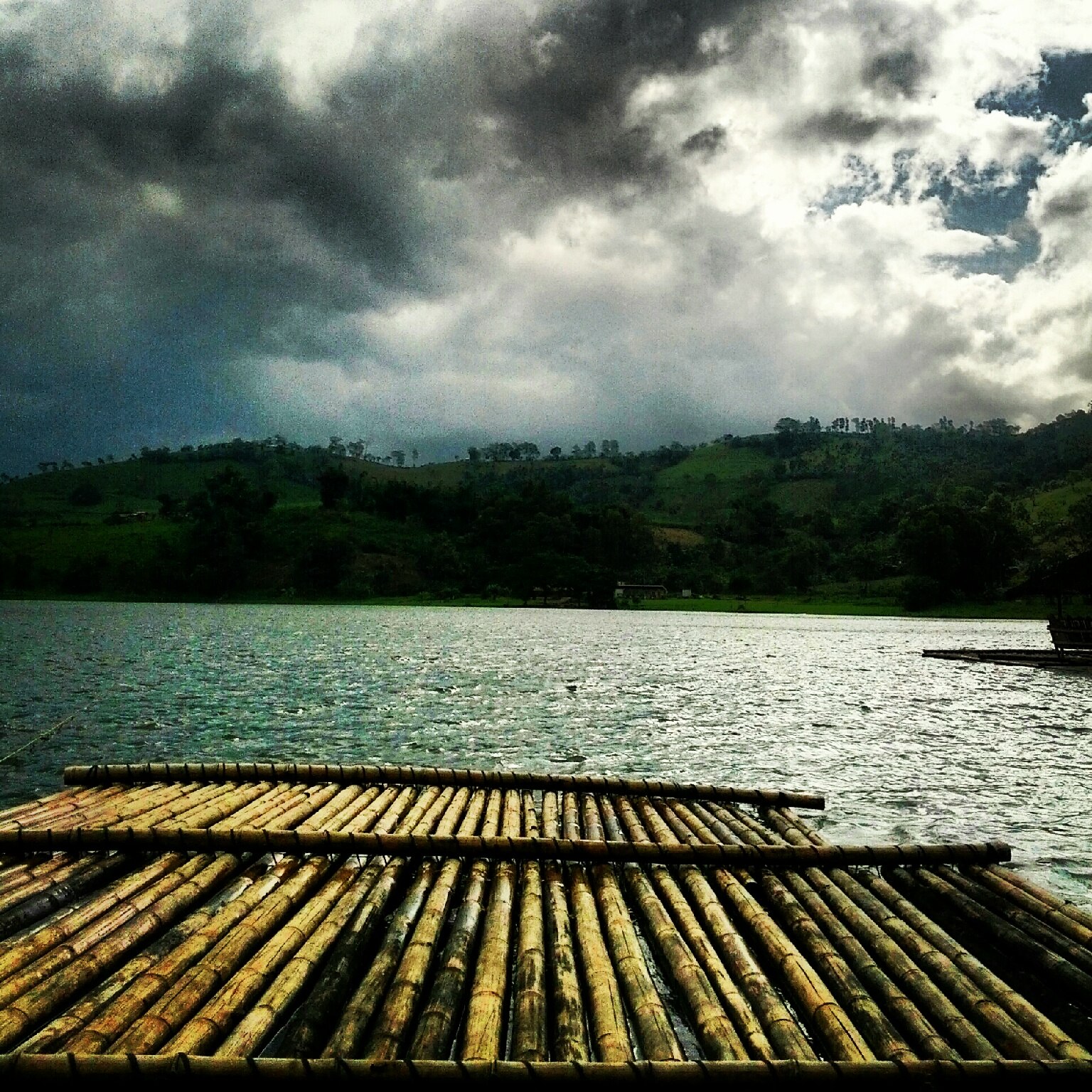
An image of the central region of the lake taken from a floating raft cottage

The lake is a crater lake, a basin formed on an old volcanic cone that was later filled with water. It was erroneously reported as a circular rift lake, as this area is not a rift zone but a volcanic area evident by the presence of nearby volcanic peaks like Musuan Peak (7 kilometres or 4.3 miles to the E), Mount Kalatungan (20 kilometres or 12 miles to the NW), Mount Dagumbaan (10 kilometres or 6.2 miles to the SW), Mount Kidongin (25 kilometres or 16 miles to the SW), and the volcanic field east of Pangantucan, Bukidnon (7 kilometres or 4.3 miles to the west). Another small volcanic cone is located just 2 km (1.2 mi) southwest of Lake Apo.

== Incidents ==
- March 29, 2015 – 2 teens were drowned after trying to cross the lake using a small bamboo raft; the said bodies were recovered on April 1.

== See also ==
- Lakes in the Philippines
- Media related to Lake Apo at Wikimedia Commons
