= Valencia Colleges (Bukidnon) Inc. =

Private college in Bukidnon, Philippines

Coordinates: 7°55′23″N 125°05′43″E

Valencia Colleges (Bukidnon), Inc.
- Motto: Discere et Discere Servire
- Motto in English: "To learn and to learn to serve"
- Type: Private, Non-Sectarian College
- Established: September 25, 1989
- President: Atty. Isaias P. Giduquio
- Vice-president: Dr. Isaias Sealza
- Location: Purok 17A, Hagkol, Brgy. Poblacion, Valencia City, Bukidnon, 8709, Philippines
- Website: www.vci.edu.ph

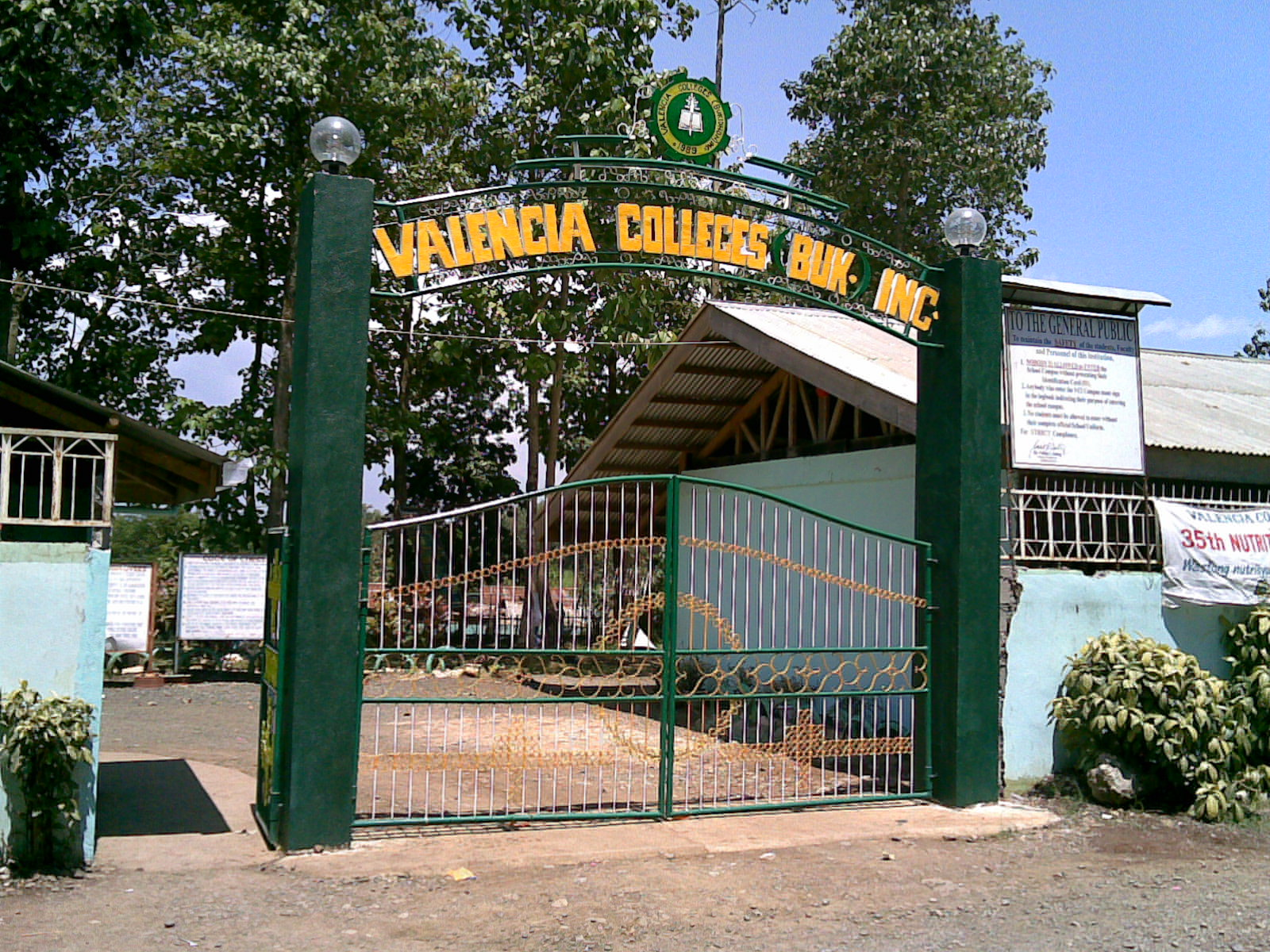
The old facade of Valencia Colleges (Bukidnon), Inc.in Hagkol, Valencia City, Bukidnon.

Valencia Colleges (Bukidnon), Incorporated, simply known as VCI, is a private, non-sectarian higher education institution located in Valencia City, Bukidnon, Philippines. Established on September 25, 1989, and incorporated in 1990, the institution offers basic education, technical-vocational training, undergraduate degrees, and graduate programs.

== History ==
In the late 1980s, Valencia, then a municipality, experienced a significant population increase due to migration from Luzon, Visayas, and other parts of Mindanao. This demographic shift created a shortage of local educational infrastructure for higher learning. The concept for the college was developed by a group of doctoral students from the Mindanao Polytechnic State College (now the University of Science and Technology of Southern Philippines) in Cagayan de Oro City. Inspired by their professor, Atty. Isaias P. Giduquio, this group sought to establish a professional, non-sectarian institution to serve the growing community.

The institution was formally organized on September 25, 1989. The founding board consisted of fifteen members, with the following elected as the inaugural administrative officers:

- President: Alexander B. Amador
- Vice-president: Melquiades G. Clarito
- Treasurer: Reynaldo B. Antonio Sr.
- Secretary: Ladisla T. Giduquio
- Auditor: Gracia Caballero

Other founding board members included Epifenio Calos, Valentina Calos, Isaias Sealza, Camilo Pepito, Irene Antonio, Encarnita Amador, Quipte Consus, Isaias Giduquio, Mario Basalo, and Pablito Intong.

=== Incorporation ===
On March 13, 1990, the school was registered with the Securities and Exchange Commission (SEC) under Registration No. 174651. It was officially named Valencia Colleges (Bukidnon) Incorporated, with the parenthetical "(Bukidnon)" added to distinguish it from the municipality of Valencia in the province of Bohol.

== Campus ==
The institution currently operates from a single consolidated campus located at Purok 17A, Hagkol, Barangay Poblacion, approximately 1.5 kilometers (0.93 mi) northeast of the city center.

=== Relocation and Development ===
VCI originally opened in a rented building on T.N. Pepito Street near the town plaza. In 2003, to accommodate increasing enrollment, the college began transferring operations to a one-hectare site in Hagkol donated by the family of founding member Epifenio Calos. While the Basic Education Department initially remained at the old site, operations have since been consolidated to the Hagkol campus. In 2025, the college began the construction of a new five-storey academic building, which will house the library and additional lecture rooms, to support its growing student population.

== Academics ==
VCI offers programs accredited by the Commission on Higher Education (CHED) and the Technical Education and Skills Development Authority (TESDA):

Basic Education Programs

- Kindergarten
- Elementary
- Junior and Senior High School

TESDA Programs

- Hotel and Restaurant Management (Modular Program)
- Bartending NC II
- Housekeeping NC II
- Bread and Pastry Production NC II
- Cookery NC II
- Food and Beverages NC II
- Caregiving NC II
- Health Care Services NC II
- Computer System Servicing NC II

Undergraduate Programs

- Bachelor of Science in Criminal Justice Education
- Bachelor of Elementary Education
- Bachelor of Secondary Education (Majors in English, Mathematics, and Social Studies)
- Bachelor of Science in Business Administration (Major in Marketing Management)
- Bachelor of Arts in Sociology

Graduate School

- Master of Arts in Teaching (Major in Social Studies)
- Master in Government Administration

The institution also operates a Junior and Senior High School offering strands such as ABM (Accountancy, Business, and Management), HUMSS (Humanities and Social Sciences), and TVL (Technical-Vocational-Livelihood). It also offers TESDA-registered short courses including Caregiving NCII, Cookery NCII, and Computer Systems Servicing NCII.

== See also ==
- Valencia City, Bukidnon
- Education in the Philippines
