= Lake Napalit =

Tectonic lake in the Philippines

- Location within the Philippines
- Location: Central Bukidnon
- Coordinates: 7°52′06″N 124°47′07″E
- Type: Tectonic lake
- Basin countries: Philippines
- Max. length: 1.75 kilometres (1.09 mi)
- Max. width: 0.33 kilometres (0.21 mi)
- Surface area: 35 hectares (86 acres)
- Shore length^{1}: 4.7 kilometres (2.9 mi)
- Surface elevation: 1,041 metres (3,415 ft)
- Islands: 0
- ^{1} Shore length is not a well-defined measure.

Lake Napalit is a small tectonic lake located in the mountains of central Bukidnon province in the Philippines. It is situated just outside the Kalatungan Mountain Range.
