= Bukidnon =

- Province
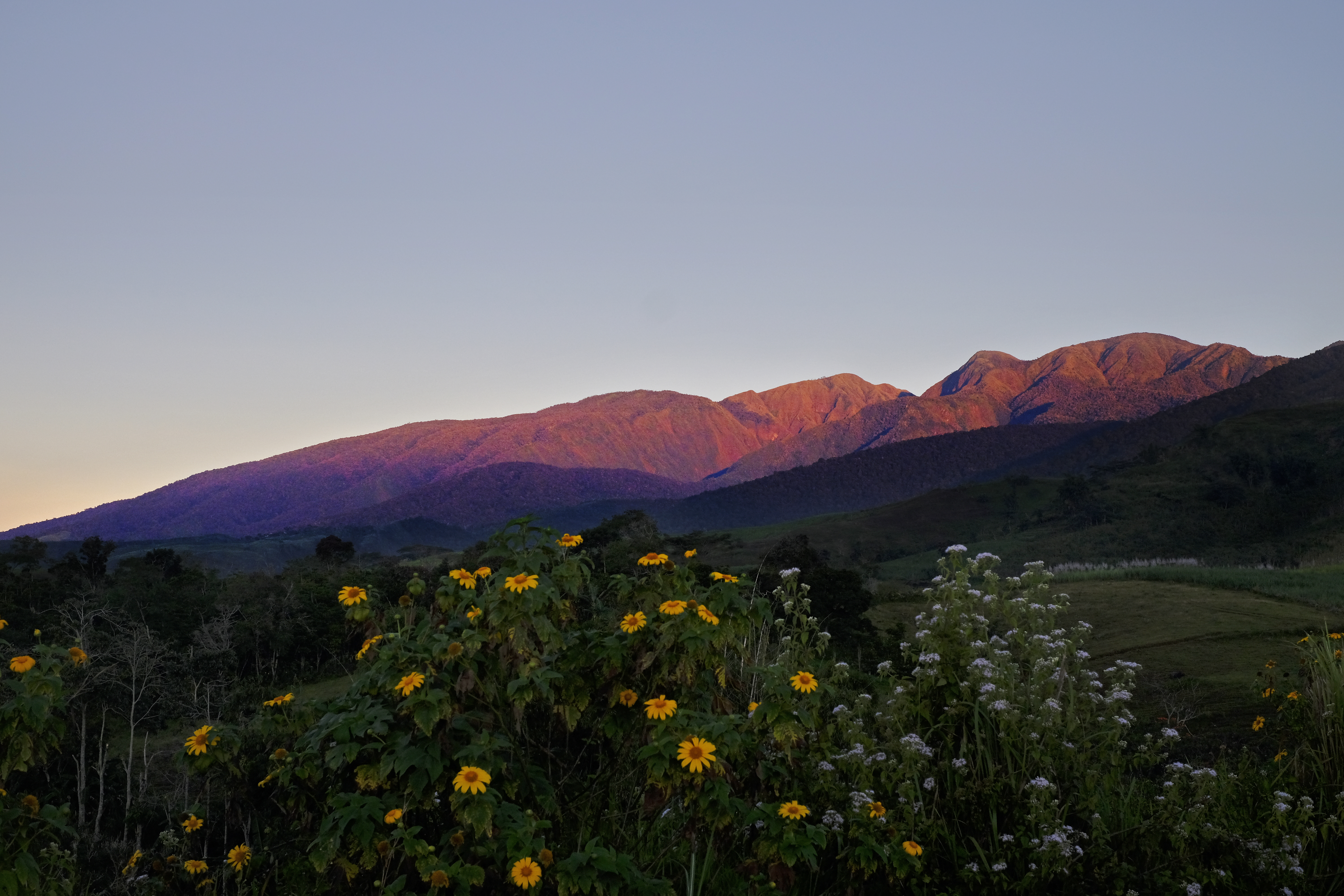
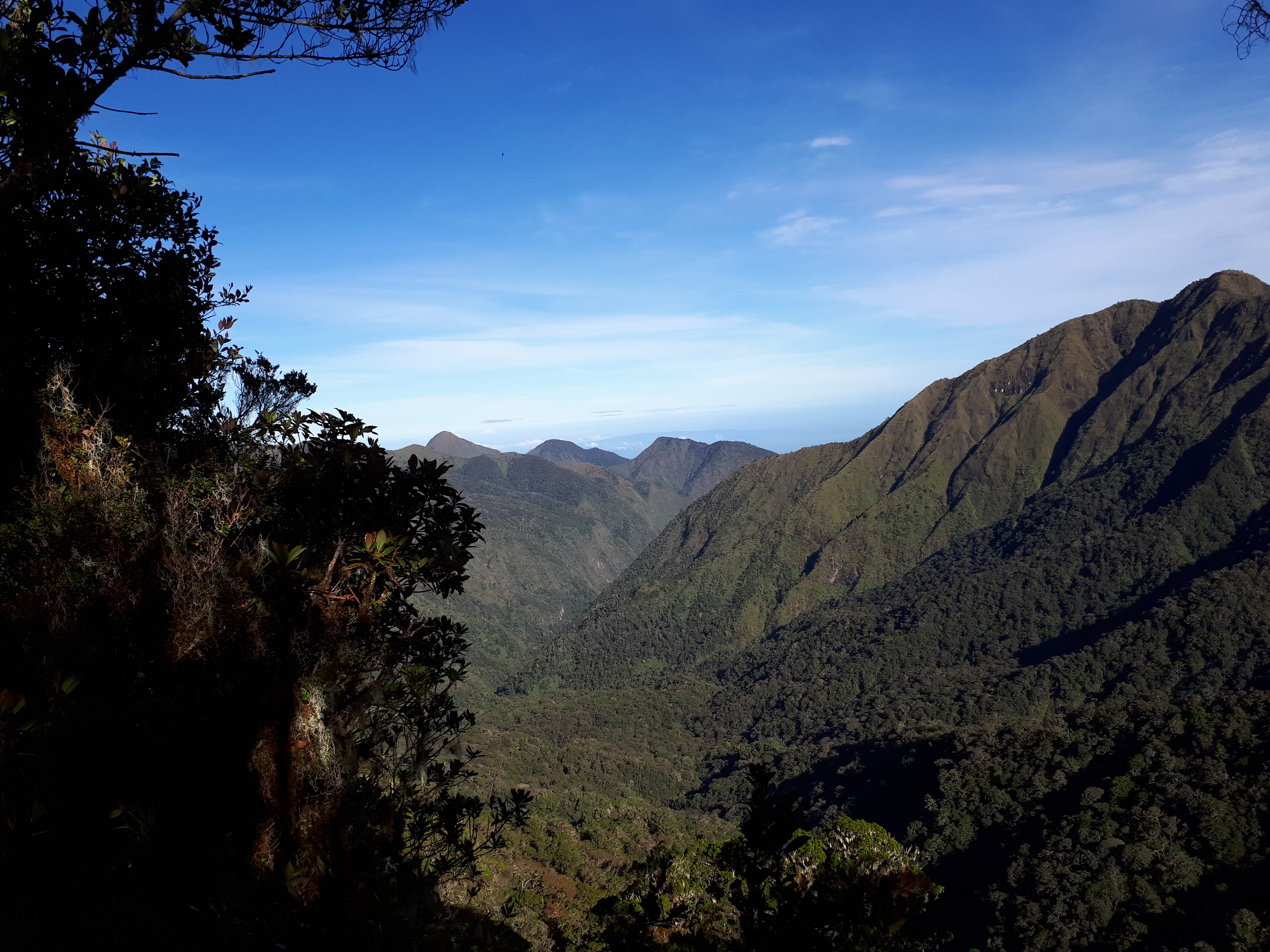
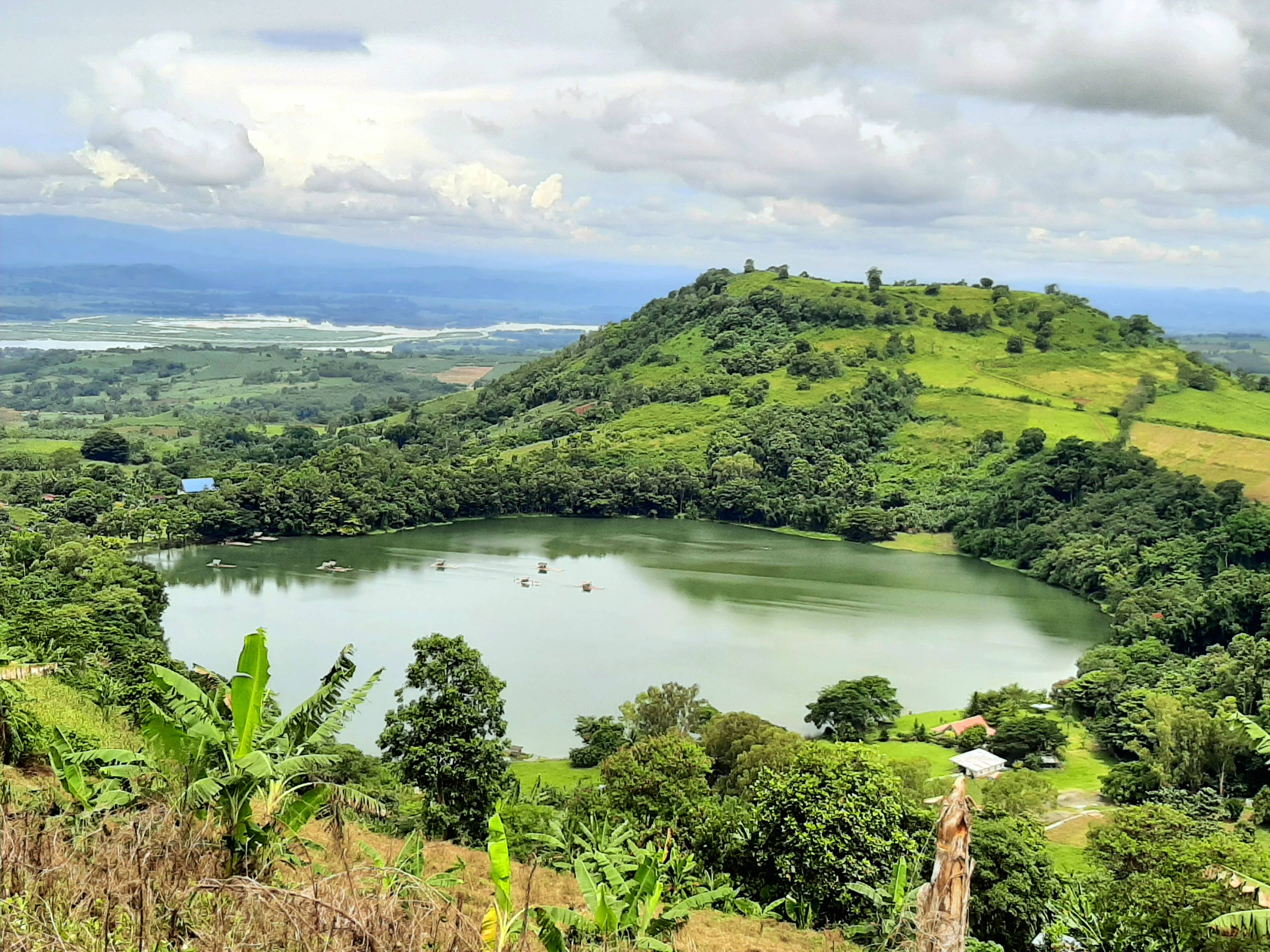
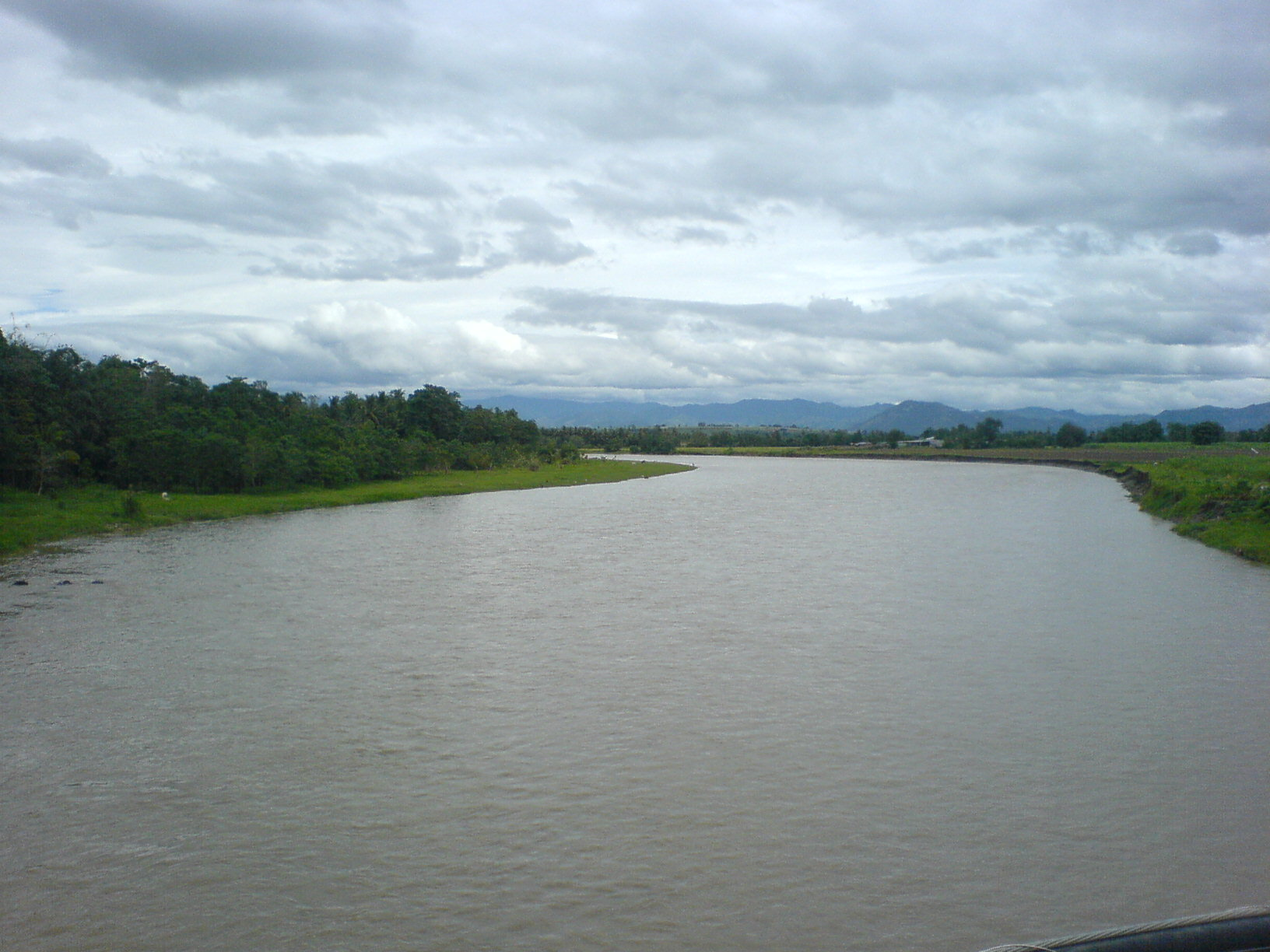
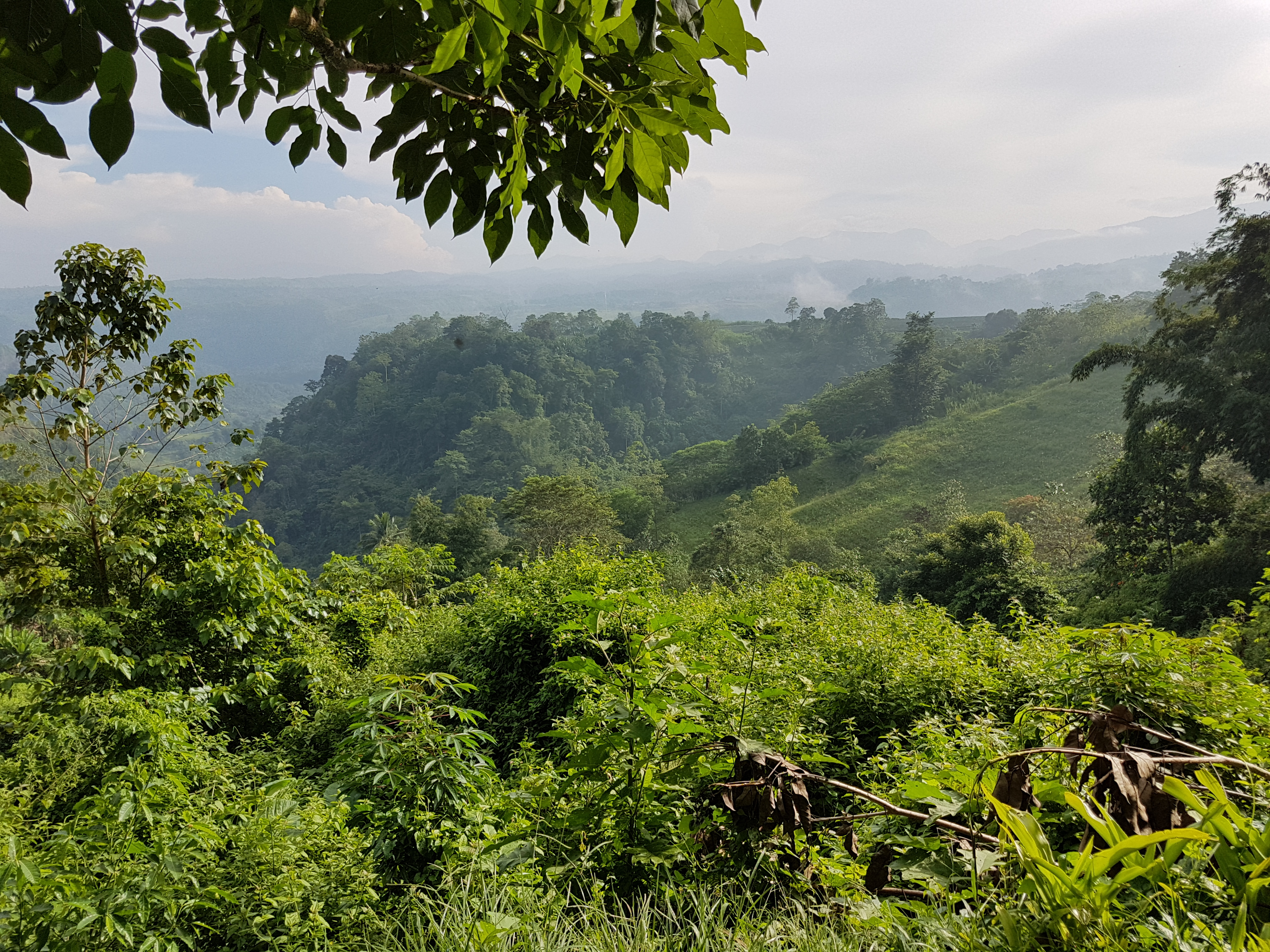
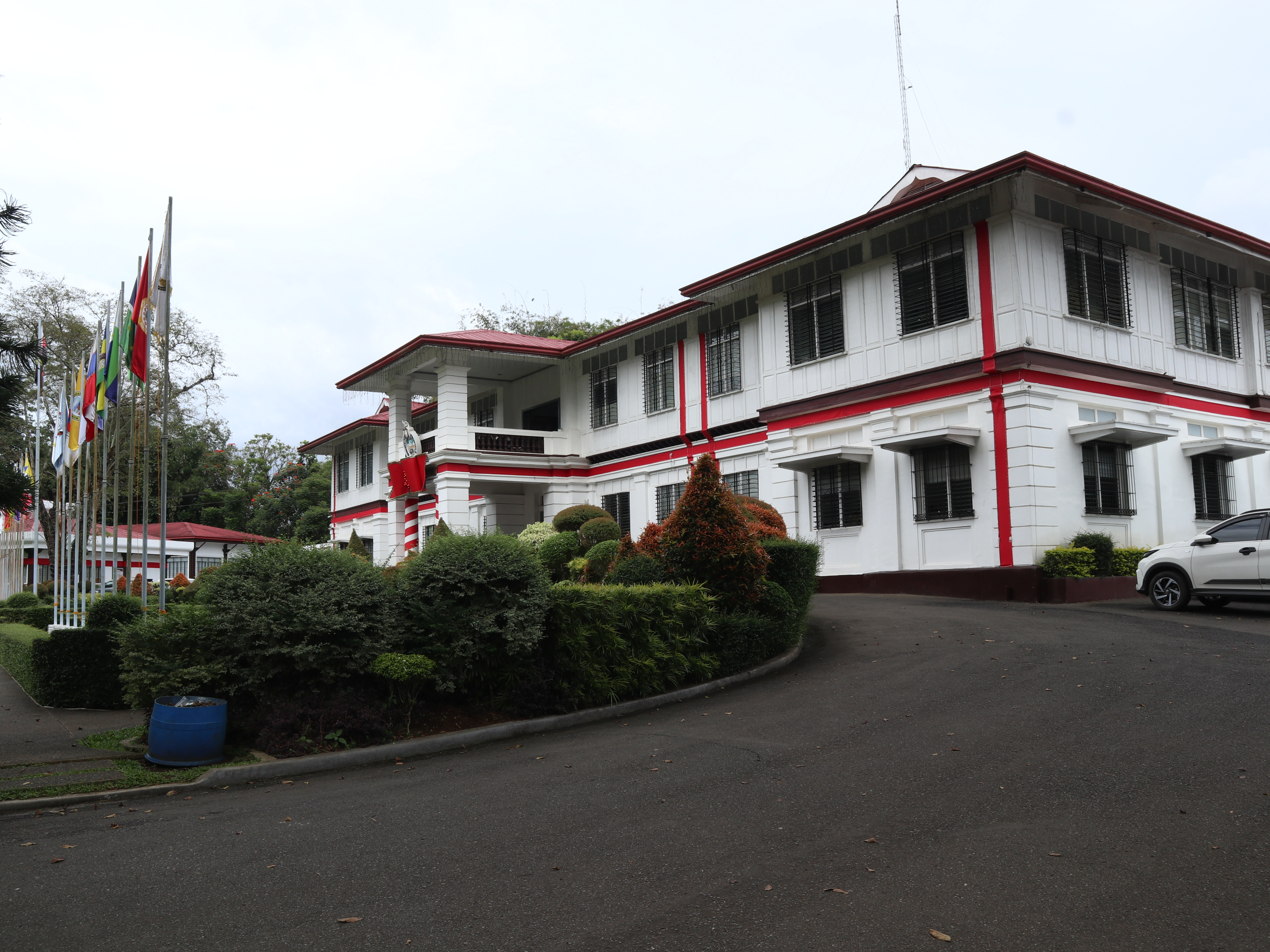
- Clockwise from the top: Mount Kalatungan, Lake Apo, Mangima Canyon, Bukidnon Provincial Capitol, Pulangi River, and Mount Kitanglad.

- Flag Seal
- Nicknames: "The Food Basket of Region X" "The Eco-tourism and Cultural Heritage Capital of Northern Mindanao" "Highland Paradise in the Heart of Mindanao"
- Anthem: Bukidnon, My Home (Bukidnon Kanak Ha Banuwa)
- Location in the Philippines
- Interactive map of Bukidnon
- Coordinates: 7°55′N 125°05′E
- Country: Philippines
- Region: Northern Mindanao
- Founded: September 1, 1914 (Commission Act 2408)
- Capital: Malaybalay
- Largest city: Valencia

Government
  - Governor: Rogelio Neil P. Roque (PFP)
  - Vice Governor: Clive D. Quiño (BPP)
  - Legislature: Bukidnon Provincial Board
  - Electorate: 995,736 voters (2025)

Area
  - Total: 10,498.59 km^{2} (4,053.53 sq mi)
  - Rank: 3rd out of 82
- Highest elevation (Mount Dulang-dulang): 2,941 m (9,649 ft)

Population (2024 census)
  - Total: 1,601,902
  - Rank: 17th out of 82
  - Density: 152.5826/km^{2} (395.1871/sq mi)
  - Rank: 61st out of 82
  - Households: 357,112
- Demonym: Bukidnon

Divisions
  - Independent cities: 0
  - Component cities: 2: Malaybalay; Valencia
  - Municipalities: 20: Baungon; Cabanglasan; Damulog; Dangcagan; Don Carlos; Impasugong; Kadingilan; Kalilangan; Kibawe; Kitaotao; Lantapan; Libona; Malitbog; Manolo Fortich; Maramag; Pangantucan; Quezon; San Fernando; Sumilao; Talakag
  - Barangays: 464
  - Districts: Legislative districts of Bukidnon

Economy
  - Income class: 1st provincial income class
  - Poverty incidence: 20.2% (2023)
  - Revenue: ₱ 5,306 million (2024)
  - Assets: ₱ 21,929 million (2024)
  - Expenditure: ₱ 4,445 million (2024)
  - Liabilities: ₱ 1,831 million (2024)
- Time zone: UTC+8 (PST)
- PSGC: 101300000
- IDD : area code: +63 (0)88
- ISO 3166 code: PH-BUK
- Spoken languages: Cebuano; Manobo; Talaandig; Maguindanaon; Iranun; Ilocano; Hiligaynon; Higaonon; Maranao; Filipino and other minority languages
- Website: www.bukidnon.gov.ph

Bukidnon (/buːˈkɪdnɒn/), officially the Province of Bukidnon (Cebuano: Lalawigan sa Bukidnon; Filipino: Lalawigan ng Bukidnon; Hiligaynon: Kapuoran sang Bukidnon; Binukid and Higaonon: Probinsya ta Bukidnon), is a landlocked province in the Philippines located in the Northern Mindanao region. Its capital is the city of Malaybalay while Valencia is the largest city. The province borders, clockwise from the north, Misamis Oriental, Agusan del Sur, Davao del Norte, Cotabato, Lanao del Sur, and Lanao del Norte. According to the 2020 census, the province is inhabited by 1,541,308 residents. The province is composed of 2 component cities and 20 municipalities. It is the third largest province in the country in terms of total area of jurisdiction behind Palawan and Isabela respectively.

The name "Bukidnon" means "highlander" or "mountain dweller." Occupying a wide plateau in the north central part of the island of Mindanao, the province is considered to be the food basket of the region, being the major producer of rice and corn. Products from plantations in the province also include pineapples, bananas and sugarcane.

Situated within Bukidnon is Mount Dulang-dulang, the 2nd highest mountain in the country, with an elevation of 2,938 metres (9,639 ft) located in the Kitanglad Mountain Range. Mount Kitanglad (2,899 m), Mount Kalatungan (2,860 m), Mount Maagnaw (2,742 m), Mount Lumuluyaw (2,612 m), and Mount Tuminungan (2,400 m), the 4th, 5th, 8th, 17th, and 30th highest mountains in the country respectively, are also found in the province.

Bukidnon was consecutively ranked 5th in the list of richest provinces in the Philippines for four straight years according to the Commission on Audit's 2018, 2019, 2020, and 2021 Annual Financial Reports which were posted in 2019, early to late 2021, and 2022, respectively.

== History ==
=== Early history ===
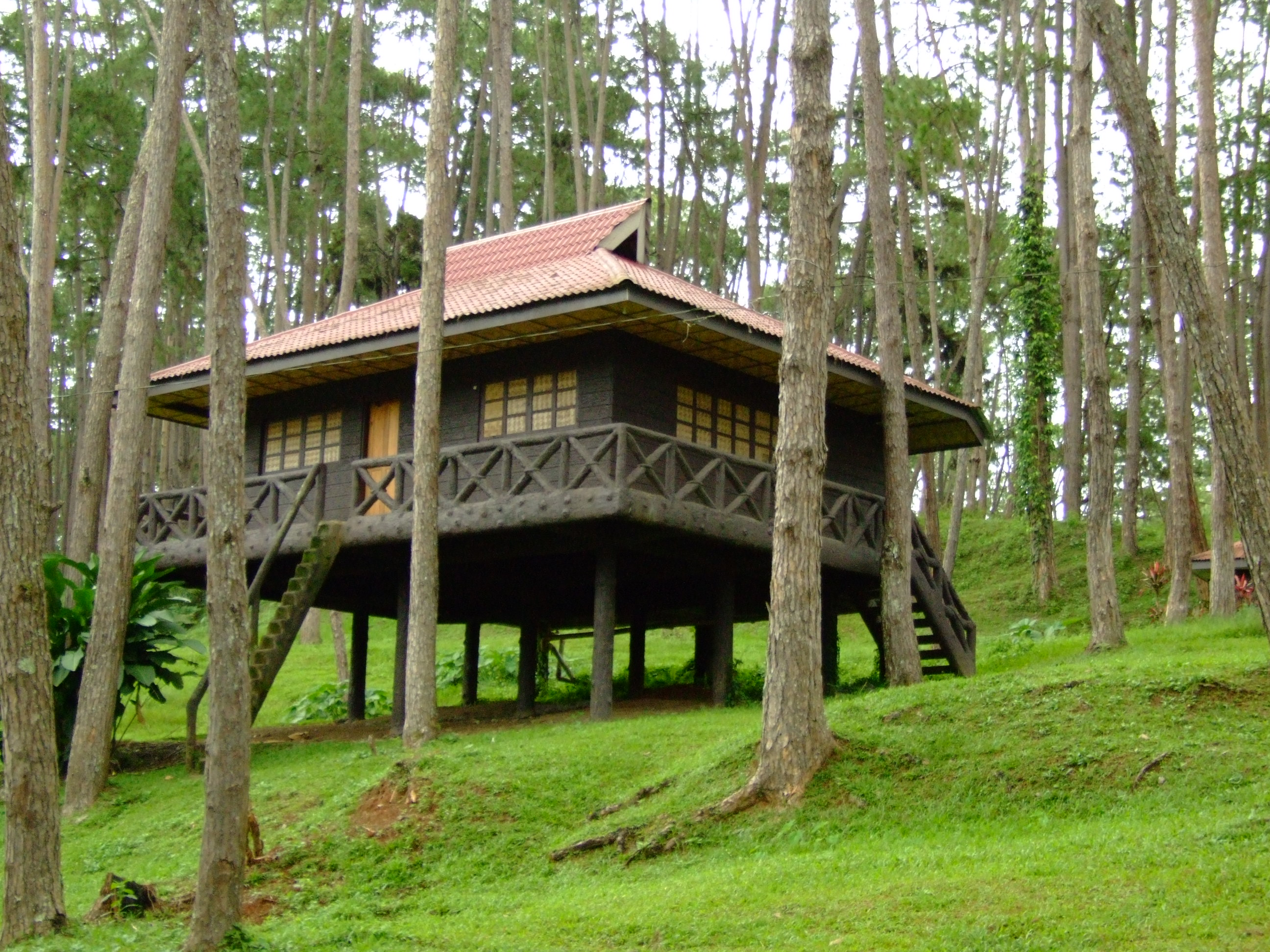
One of the "tulugan" at Kaamulan Park, Malaybalay

According to oral history of the Indigenous people of Bukidnon, there were four main tribes in Central Mindanao: the Maranaos who dwell in Lanao del Sur, and the Maguindanao, Manobo and Talaandig tribes who respectively inhabit the eastern, southern, and north-central portions of the original province of Cotabato. When the civil government divided central Mindanao into provinces at the turn of the 20th century, the groups included in the province of Bukidnon are the Talaandig and the Manobo, as well as other smaller Lumad tribes. The Visayans, particularly the Cebuanos and the Hiligaynons from the Northern Mindanao coastline and the southern Visayas, migrated into the province. The Visayans are still referred to by the Lumad as the dumagat ("sea people") to distinguish them from the original mountain tribes. This was followed by various groups from Luzon, namely, the Ilocanos, the Igorots and the Ivatans, many of whom were merchants and wealthy entrepreneurs. All contributed massive acculturation among the Indigenous tribes. Most of those who moved to the mountains and forest continued to hold on their ancestors' cultural heritage. The wide variety of Filipino groups now thrives in the province and contributed immensely in the socioeconomic development.

=== Spanish colonial era ===
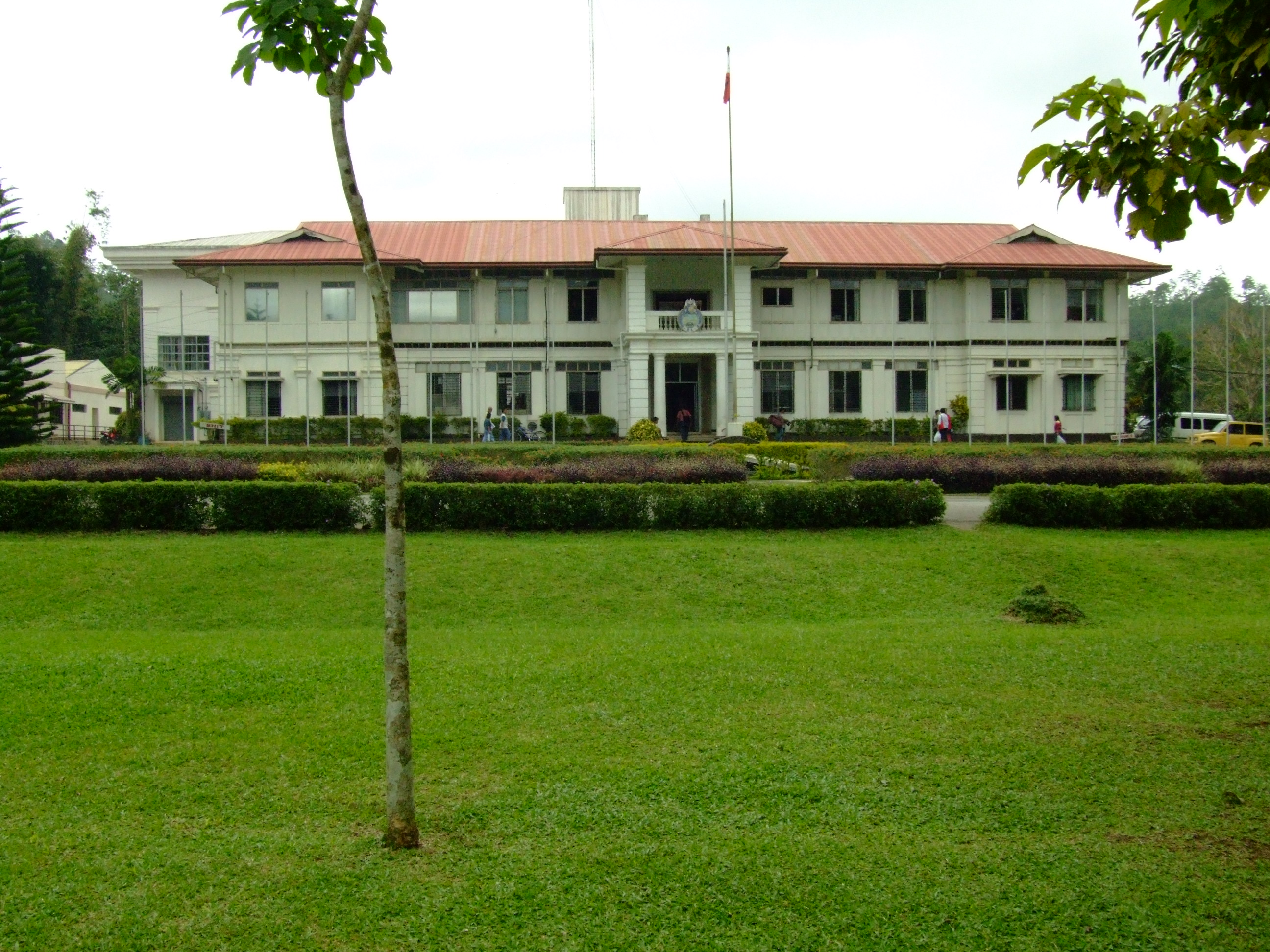
Bukidnon Provincial Capitol, Malaybalay

Bukidnon became a part of Misamis in the latter part of 1850. The whole area was then called "Malaybalay" and the people were known as Bukidnons (highlanders or mountain dwellers).

=== American colonial era ===
The Philippine Commission, then headed by Commissioner Dean C. Worcester, Secretary of Interior, proposed the separation of Bukidnon from Misamis Province. On August 20, 1907, Act No. 1693 created the province of Agusan with Bukidnon as its sub-province. About a month later, on September 23, the rancheria of Malaybalay was designated as the sub-province's capital. Bukidnon became a regular province on March 10, 1917, by virtue of the creation of the Department of Mindanao and Sulu under Act 2711.

=== Japanese occupation ===
In 1942, invading Japanese troops entered Bukidnon. Mount Capistrano was a civilian evacuation area in the World War II. In 1945, the province was liberated from Japanese occupation by Filipino and American troops with the aid of Bukidnon-based Filipino guerrillas during the Second World War.

=== Martial law era ===
The 21-year administration of Ferdinand Marcos, which included 14 years of one-man rule under Marcos, saw the rise of ethnic conflicts and the overall degradation of peace and order in Bukidnon and throughout Mindanao - first in the form of conflicts between local Mindanaoan Muslims and Christian settlers which the Marcos administration had encouraged first to migrate and then to form militias, and later in the form of Muslim secessionist movements arising from outrage after the 1986 Jabidah massacre. Additionally, an economic crisis in late 1969 led to social unrest throughout the country, and violent crackdowns on protests led to the radicalization of many students, with some joining the New People's Army, bringing the Communist rebellion to Mindanao. In September 1972, Marcos was nearing the end of this last term allowed under the Philippines 1935 constitution when he placed the entirety of the Philippines under Martial Law, a period historically remembered for its human rights abuses, particularly targeting political opponents, student activists, journalists, religious workers, farmers, and others who fought against the Marcos dictatorship.

Describing the specific sociopolitical situation in Bukindnon, the Philippines' Bantayog ng mga Bayani memorial notes:

Bukidnon was a land of great social divisions. Politics was rough, and bullets counted more than ballots. Peasants were oppressed by landlords, usurers and middlemen, and power was in the hands of a few. Conflicts simmered between the indigenous tribes, the settlers from the Visayas, and the ranchers and loggers who extracted the area’s rich natural resources.

Clergy in the Roman Catholic church were among the most prominent voices opposing the Marcos dictatorship in Bukidnon, most notably Bishop Francisco Claver, who was Bishop of Malaybalay from 1969 to 1984, and Fr. Godofredo Alingal, S.J. of Kibawe, Bukidnon, who was assassinated in the Kibawe convent on April 13, 1981 after receiving numerous threats due to his advocacy for Bukidnon's poor.

==== Deforestation during the Marcos era ====
The Marcos era was a time of significant deforestation in Bukidnon and throughout the Philippines, with the forest cover of the Philippines shrinking until only 8% remained. In Bukidnon, one of the major companies given Timber License Agreements (TLAs) to cut down trees during Martial Law was the Agricultural and Management Engineering Company (Ameco) owned by Juan Ponce Enrile. Enrile was the government official Ferdinand Marcos put in place to approve Timber License Agreements during Martial Law.

=== Later 20th Century ===
On March 22, 1998, President Fidel Ramos signed the act (R.A. 8490) that converted Malaybalay to a city, making it the first component city of Bukidnon.

== Geography ==
Bukidnon is a landlocked plateau in north-central Mindanao and the only one in Northern Mindanao. It is bounded on the north by Misamis Oriental and Cagayan de Oro; on the south by Cotabato and Davao City; on the east by Agusan del Sur and Davao del Norte; and west by Lanao del Sur. It lies between parallels 7°25' and 8°38' north latitude and meridians 124°03' and 125°16' east longitude. Malaybalay, the capital city, is about 850 kilometers (530 mi) by air from Manila and 91 kilometers (57 mi) by road from Cagayan de Oro.

It has two important landmarks, Mount Kitanglad and Pulangi River. Mount Kitanglad has a peak of 2,899 meters (9,511 ft) above sea level. Pulangi River, on the other hand, traverses through the northeastern and southern part of the province towards the Rio Grande de Mindanao.

=== Land area ===
The province's total land area is 10,498.59 square kilometres (4,053.53 sq mi),10,498.59 making it the largest in Mindanao in terms of land area. It accounts for 59 percent (59%) of Northern Mindanao. Thirty-eight percent (38%) is classified as alienable and disposable. The rest is timberland forest.

It also accounts for 80 percent (80%) or 34 million metric tons of the region's nonmetallic mineral deposits, which include high grade white and red clay, gold, chromite, copper, serpentine, manganese, quartz and limestone deposits can also be found in the province.

=== Topography ===
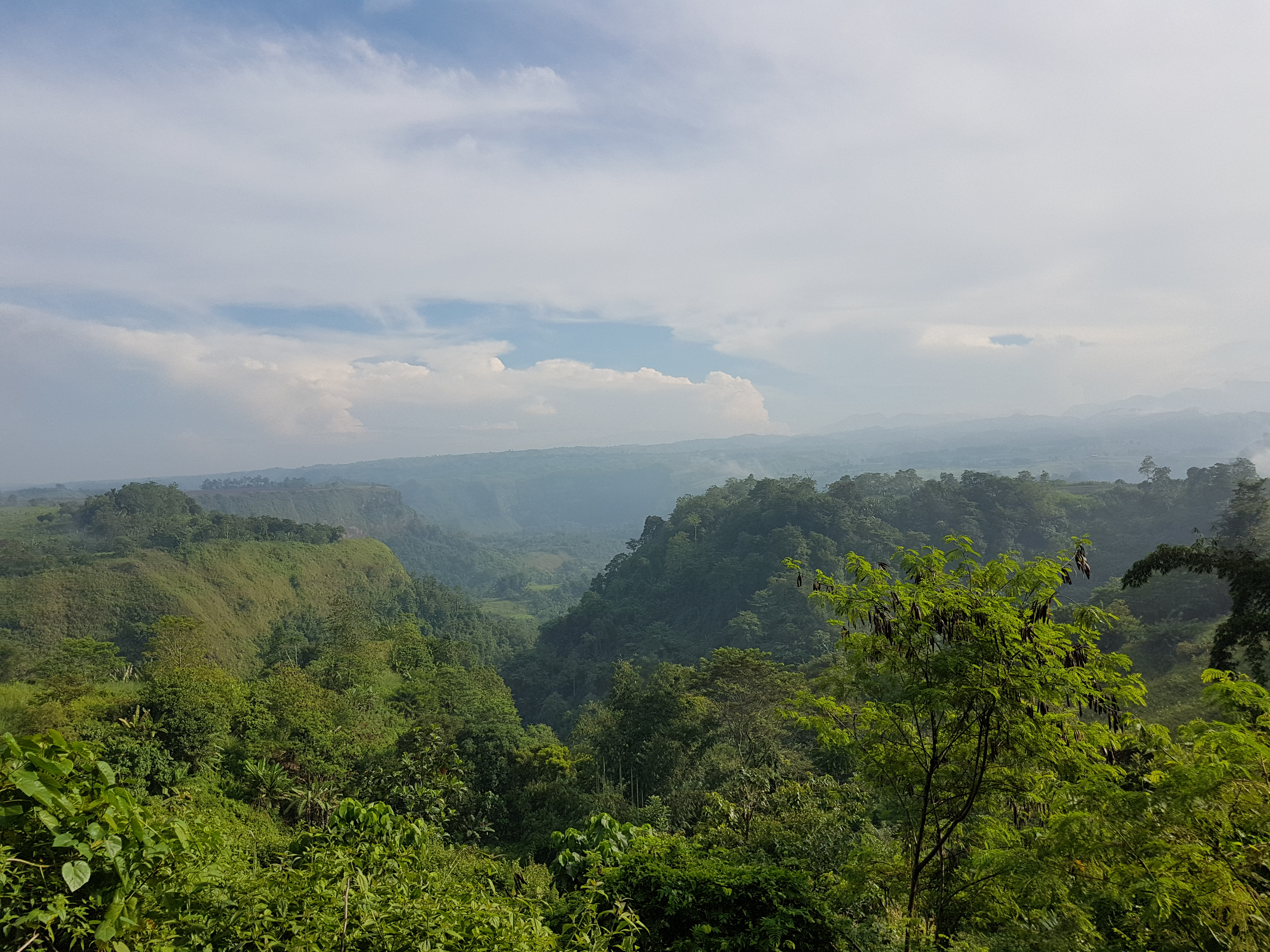
Mangima Canyon at Maluko, Manolo Fortich. Also located in the town is a canyon near barangay Lunocan, dubbed as the "Grand Canyon of the Philippines".

Much of Bukidnon is an extensive plateau, but the southern and eastern boundaries are mountainous. The province's average elevation is 915 meters (3,002 ft) above sea level. The slope gradient peaks at 2,899 meters (9,511 ft) of Mount Kitanglad, an extinct volcano occupying the central portion. Two other mountain bodies are found in its southern portion, Mount Kalatungan and Mount Tangkulan, which rise to 2,287 meters (7,503 ft) and 1,678 meters (5,505 ft), respectively. The rest of the province is composed of nearly level terraces, alluvial plains, canyons and gorges. The volcanic terraces and volcanic foot slopes that are ≥500 m above sea level are estimated to be about 221,600 hectares (548,000 acres).

Gently rolling grassland plateau are cut by deep and wide canyons of the Cagayan, Pulangi, and Tagoloan rivers and their tributaries, which cover a greater part of the province. The Bukidnon plateau is mainly of volcanic zone consisting of pyroclastic, basaltic and andesitic cones.

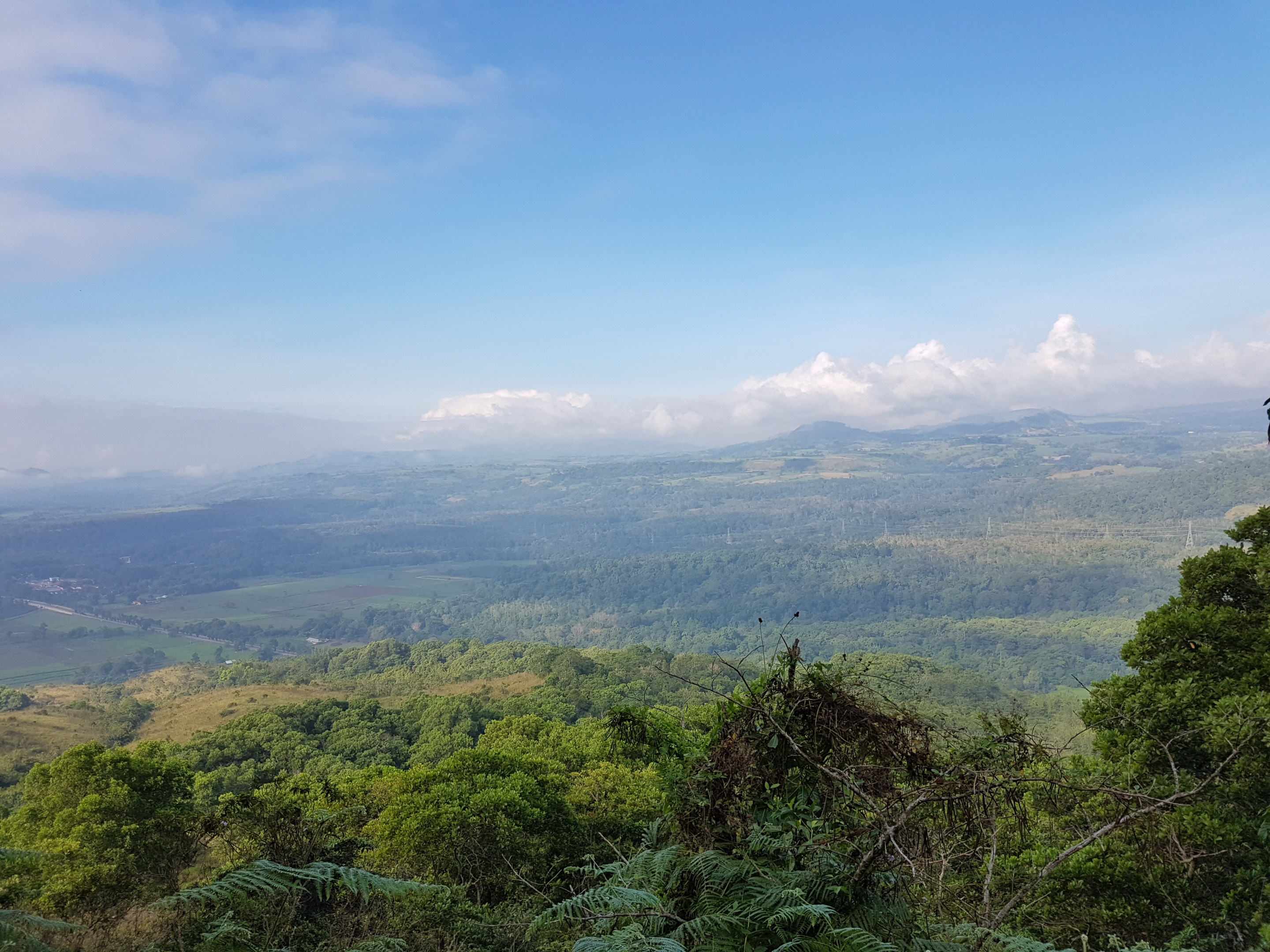
View from Musuan Peak of the Maapag Plain of central Bukidnon. The foothills of the Kalatungan Mountain Range is visible on the upper right.

The whole eastern and southern border adjoining the provinces of Agusan, Davao del Norte, and Cotabato are covered by lofty and densely forested Pantaron Mountain Range, also known as the Central Cordillera. The Central Cordillera is a mountain range of sedimentary, metamorphic and igneous rocks. About 49% of the land resource of the province is of rugged hills and mountains and 33% of undulating to rolling terrain.

At Mailag, 23 kilometers (14 mi) south of Malaybalay, the plateau begins to descend and gradually merges into the lowlands of Cotabato province.

=== Climate ===
Two types of climate are roughly divided by the northern and southern areas of Bukidnon. The northern part is classified as belonging to Type III, that is, there is no pronounced rain period but relatively dry during the months of November to May. In the southern portion of the province, the climate is classified as Type IV with no dry season. The driest area is Baungon, while the wettest is the Calabugao plain. The climate is relatively cool and humid throughout the year.

The average annual rainfall is 2,800 millimeters (110 in). Just like in other parts of the country, rainfall is more pronounced from June to October compared to other months of the year. February to April are the drier months.

Temperature ranges vary with elevation. In areas lower than 500 meters (1,600 ft) above sea level (m.a.s.l.), the recorded temperature range is between 20 and 34 °C (68 and 93 °F). Areas with elevations greater than 500 meters (1,600 ft) above sea level would have temperatures ranging from 18 to 28 °C (64 to 82 °F).

Relative humidity also varies with elevation, with those above 500 m having relative humidity of about 80%, while areas lying below 500 meters (1,600 ft), 65-7 percent. Thus, the Malaybalay-Impasugong area and those around the volcanic cones approximate semi-temperate conditions and can support the cultivation of highland tropical crops.

Based on the records of climatological stations within and near the province, lithology and land form, three agro-ecological zones are identified. One covers the mountainous eastern side (Central Cordillera), which is generally wet, with rainfall of about 2,340 to 4,000 millimeters (92 to 157 in) per annum. Another covers the high altitude volcanic plains, the Malaybalay-Impasug-ong area, and the foot slopes of Mount Kitanglad, and Mount Kalatungan. These areas have an annual rainfall in the range of 2,490 to 3,680 millimeters (98 to 145 in). The third zone covers the south-central and the north-western parts of the province, with elevations of less than 500 meters, relatively dry with mean annual rainfall in the range of 1,700 to 2,600 millimeters (67 to 102 in).

=== Bodies of water ===
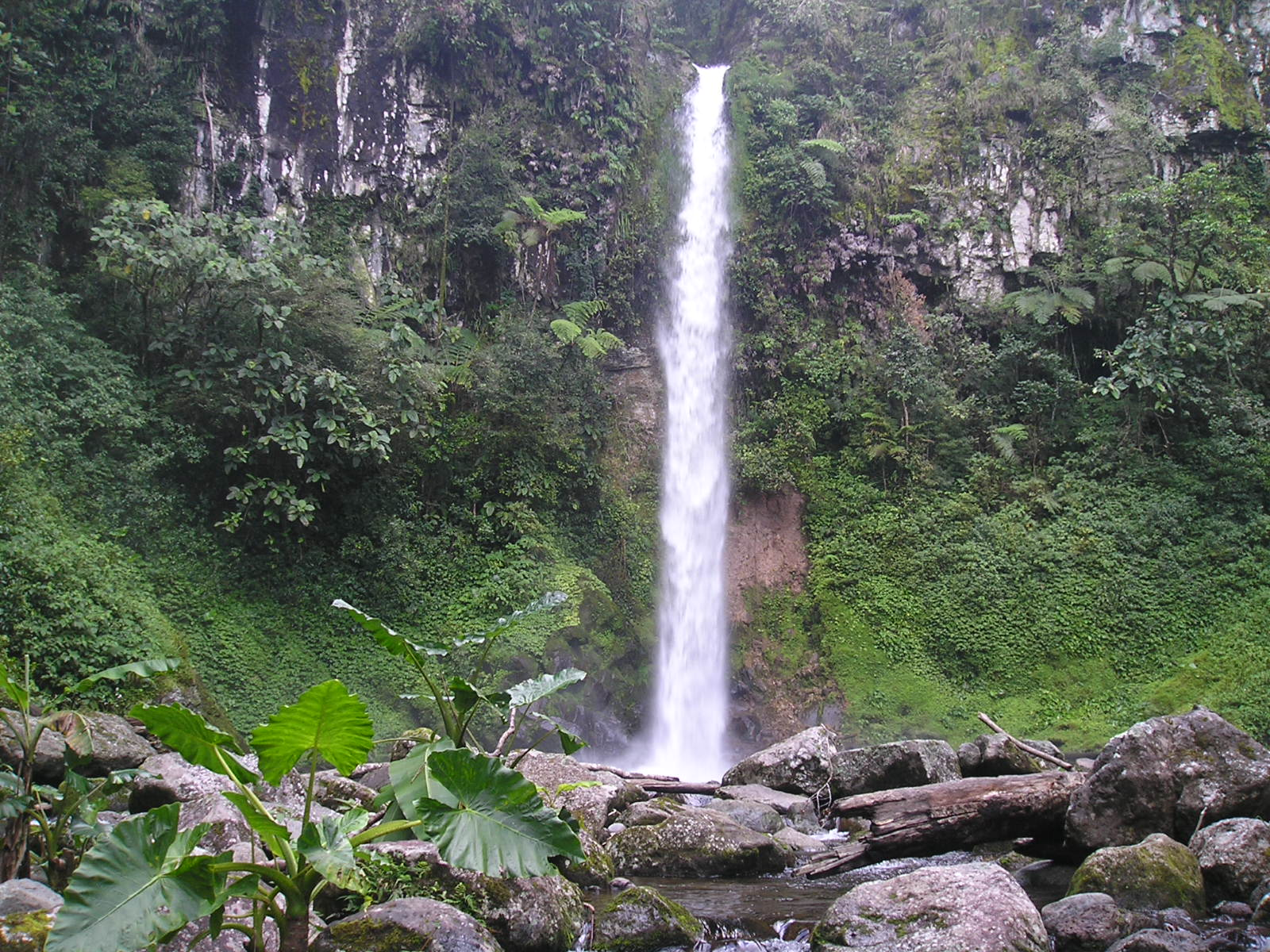
A waterfall found within the boundaries of the Kalatungan Mountain Range

==== Rivers ====
Bukidnon is home to the largest concentration of watersheds in Mindanao. It is endowed with six major river systems, namely: Pulangi, Tagoloan, Cagayan, Manupali, Muleta, and Bobonawan rivers. These rivers and their tributaries carved the landscape of the province, creating numerous canyons into the plateau.

The Pulangi River, considered the longest river in the province, is a tributary of the Rio Grande de Mindanao. Its headwaters are found in the mountains of Kalabugao, Impasugong. It is the largest as well as the longest river found in the province. It covers the following cities and municipalities of the province: Impasugong, Malaybalay, Cabanglasan, San Fernando, Valencia, Maramag, Quezon, Don Carlos, Kitaotao, Dangcagan, Kibawe and Damulog.

The Tagoloan River has its headwaters in the mountains of Can-ayan, Malaybalay. It traverses the province northwestward passing through Malaybalay, Impasugong, Sumilao, Manolo Fortich, Malitbog and finally empties into the sea at Tagoloan, Misamis Oriental.

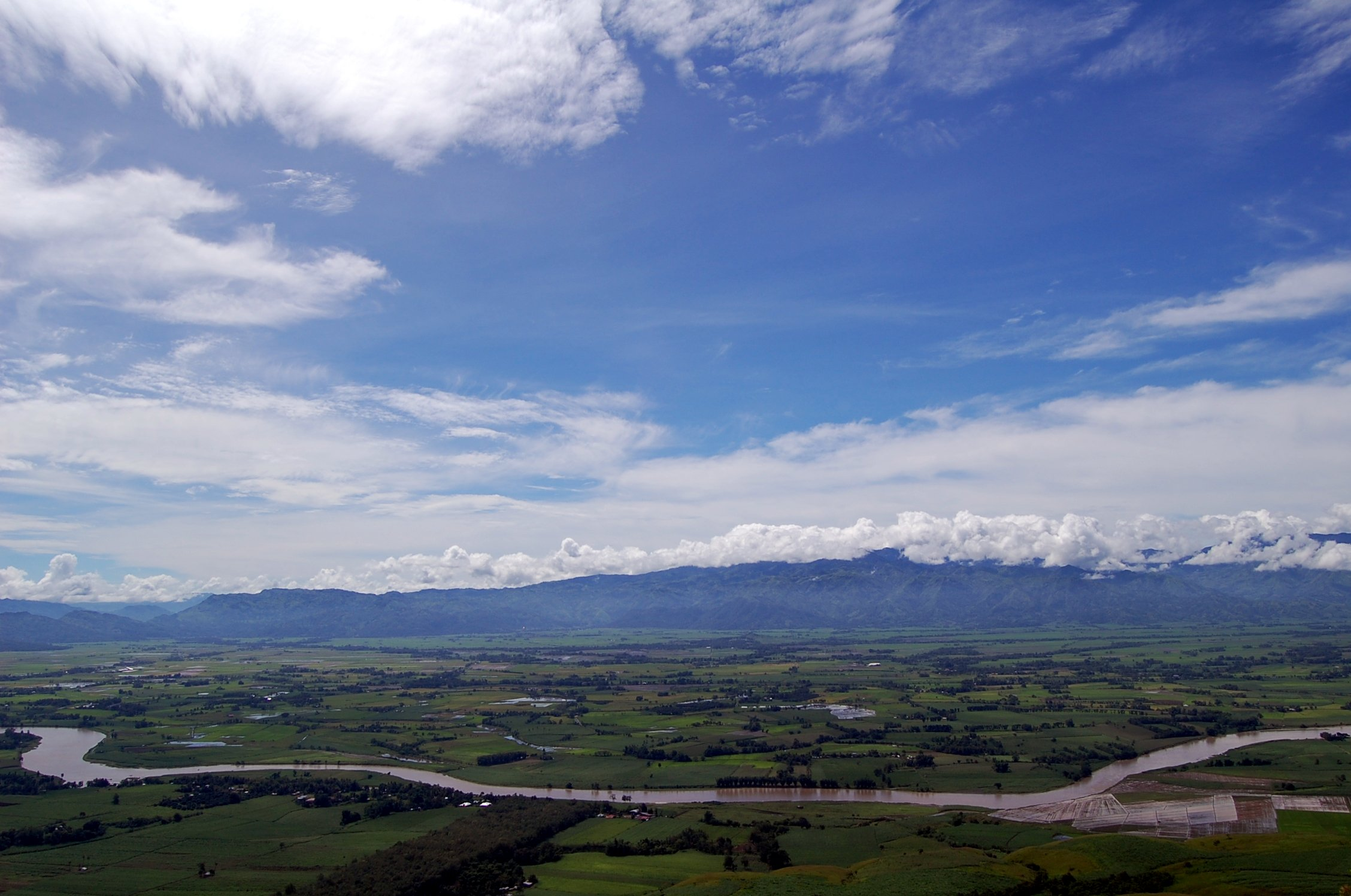
The Pulangi River winding through the Maapag Plain in Valencia City

The Cagayan River watershed is found mostly in the municipality of Talakag. Its headwaters are found in the Kitanglad Mountain Range in central Bukidnon. The river flows northward through the municipalities of Talakag and Baungon. Its mouth lies at Cagayan de Oro in Misamis Oriental, where it is the main source of potable water.

The Manupali River, a major tributary of the Pulangi River, starts in the mountains of Lantapan, Bukidnon, picking up tributaries along the way from the Kalatungan and Kitanglad Mountain Ranges. It forms part of the natural boundary of the Valencia and Lantapan. It flows eastward towards Malaybalay, eventually joining the Pulangi River in Valencia.

The Muleta River is found in the southern portion of the province covering the municipalities of Pangantucan, Don Carlos, Kitaotao, Dangcagan, Kibawe, Kadingilan and Damulog. It is another important tributary of the Pulangi River and flows southward. It will join the Pulangi River in the boundary of Bukidnon and Cotabato province.

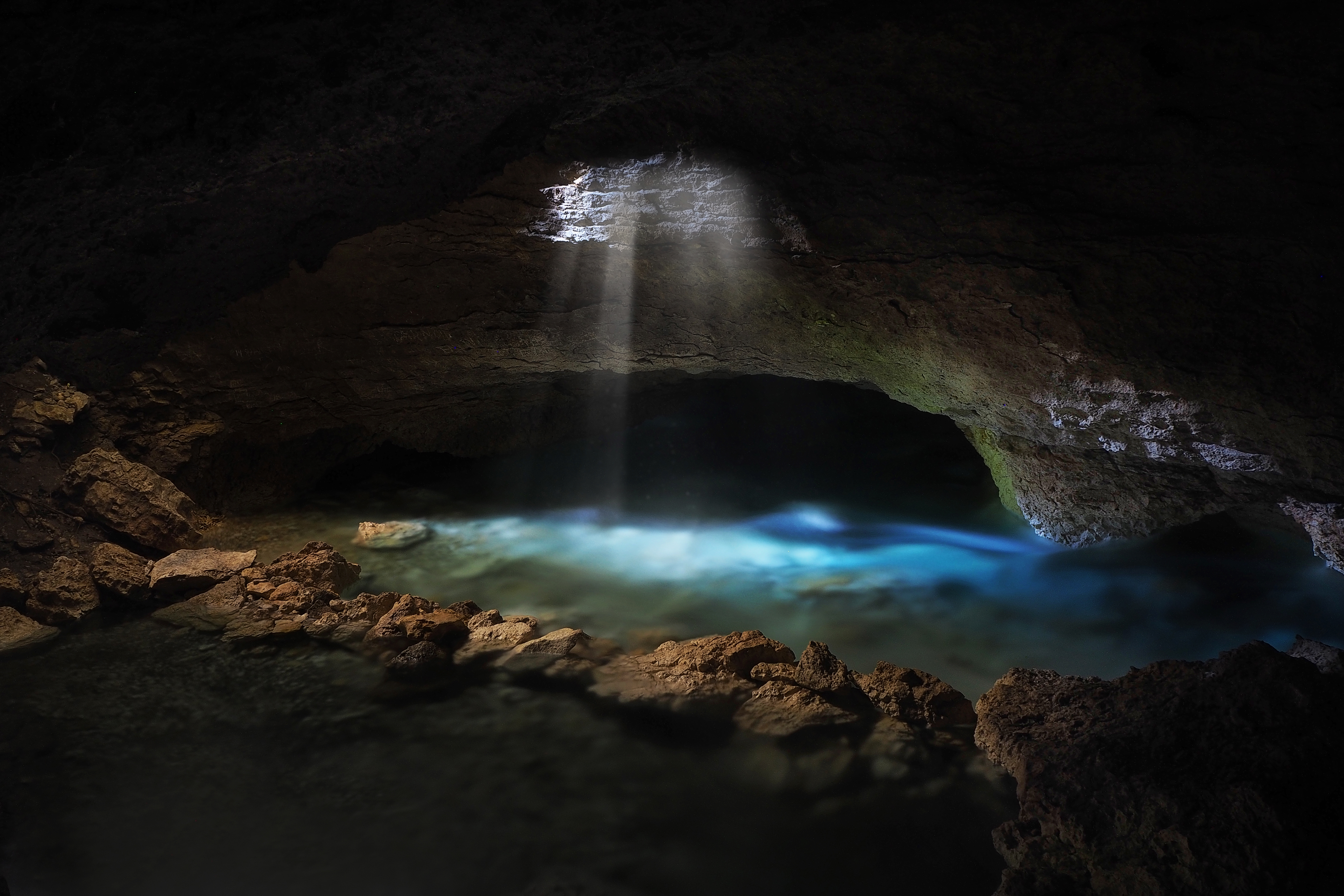
The Blue Water Cave in Quezon

The Bobonawan River, found in the municipality of Cabanglasan, is another tributary of the Pulangi River. It covers most of the parts of the municipality, flowing southward towards Pulangi River.

==== Lakes ====
Aside from the relatively important river systems, various lakes also dot the landscape of the province. Pinamaloy Lake, in Don Carlos, Bukidnon, is the largest in the province covering about 50 hectares. It was named after Barangay Pinamaloy, where the lake is located. Another lake is found in Pigtauranan, Pangantucan called the Napalit Lake. The lake covers an area of 36 hectares and is one of the tourist spots in Pangantucan, Bukidnon. There are 24 floating islets in the lake. The third significant inland body of water in the province is Apo Lake at Guinoyoran, Valencia. It occupies an approximate area of 25 hectares. A man-made lake called Pulangi Lake or Maramag Lake is found in Maramag, Bukidnon, which was the result of the construction of the Pulangi IV Hydroelectric Dam of the National Power Corporation (NPC) in the course of the Pulangi River.

==== Springs and waterfalls ====
There are also numerous springs and waterfalls located in the province. Some of the waterfalls include the Alalum Falls, Dimadungawan Falls, Dila Falls, Gantungan Falls, Natigbasan Falls, Sagumata Falls, Magubo Falls, and Balisbisan Falls.

== Biodiversity ==
The Pantaron Mountain Range in Bukidnon is a biodiverse area that hosts endemic fauna. It is home to the critically endangered Philippine eagle, the vulnerable Philippine deer, the Philippine flying lemur, and the Mindanao gymnure. The Mount Kitanglad Mountain Range is home to the Philippine eagle, the Mindanao pygmy fruit bat, the Kitanglad shrew-mouse (Crunomys suncoides), and the gray-bellied mountain rat (Limonmys bryophilus). Rafflesia schadenbergiana has also been found on Mount Kitanglad.

Mount Musuan and Mount Kalatungan, along with Mount Malindang in Misamis Occisdental, are also home to the Philippine eagle, the Mindanao wrinkled hornbill (Aceros leococephalus), and the Philippine tarsier (Tarsius syrichta). The three mountains are home to more than 1,000 plant species, including 12 that are endangered, 221 that are endemic, 17 that are rare, and 187 that are economically or socioculturally important.

== Administrative divisions ==
Bukidnon is subdivided into 20 municipalities and 2 cities.

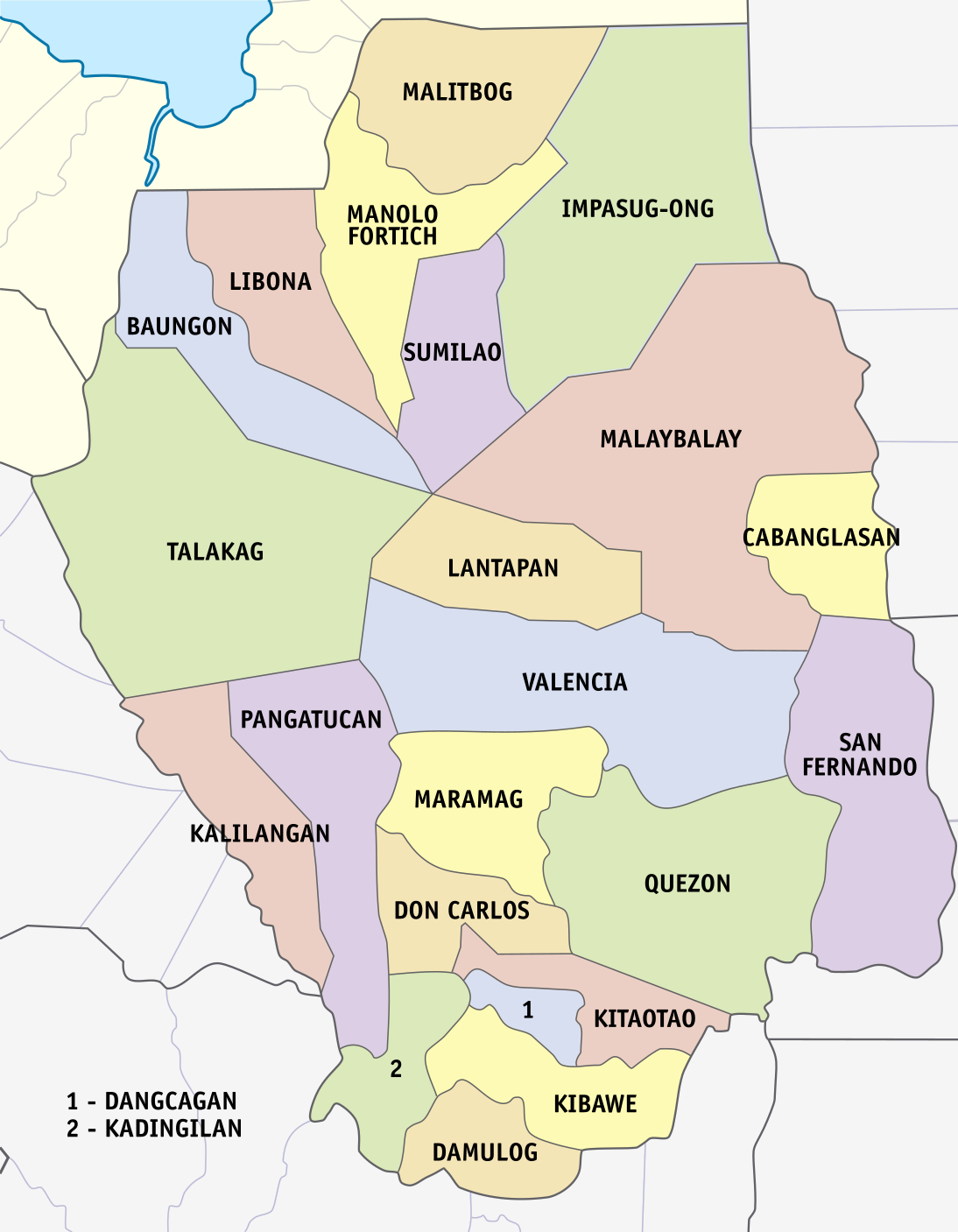
Political divisions of Bukidnon

- † Provincial capital and component city
- ∗ Component city
- Municipality

City or municipality		Date of creation	Population			±% p.a.	Area		Density		Barangay	Coordinates^{[A]}
			(2020)		(2015)		km^{2}	sq mi	/km^{2}	/sq mi		
Baungon		13 Feb 1957	2.4%	37,111	34,336	+1.49%	328.34	126.77	110	280	16	8°18′45″N 124°41′14″E
Cabanglasan		13 Aug 1979	2.4%	36,286	33,997	+1.25%	243.30	93.94	150	390	15	8°04′35″N 125°18′04″E
Damulog		16 Aug 1971	2.6%	39,322	30,302	+5.09%	244.19	94.28	160	410	17	7°28′53″N 124°56′20″E
Dangcagan		29 Aug 1961	1.7%	26,076	23,723	+1.82%	422.69	163.20	62	160	14	7°36′36″N 125°00′15″E
Don Carlos		18 Jun 1966	4.5%	69,273	66,959	+0.65%	213.72	82.52	320	830	29	7°41′02″N 124°59′41″E
Impasugong		6 Sep 1877	3.5%	53,863	47,859	+2.28%	1,051.17	405.86	51	130	13	8°18′12″N 125°00′03″E
Kadingilan		16 Aug 1971	2.2%	33,735	33,778	−0.02%	171.94	66.39	200	520	17	7°36′00″N 124°54′36″E
Kalilangan		18 Jun 1966	2.8%	43,711	41,601	+0.95%	251.43	97.08	170	440	14	7°44′48″N 124°44′53″E
Kibawe		1 Jul 1956	2.7%	41,897	39,612	+1.07%	304.13	117.43	140	360	23	7°34′04″N 124°59′25″E
Kitaotao		18 Jun 1966	3.5%	53,796	50,260	+1.30%	788.78	304.55	68	180	35	7°38′20″N 125°00′27″E
Lantapan		18 Jun 1966	4.3%	65,974	61,776	+1.26%	328.35	126.78	200	520	14	8°01′34″N 124°59′17″E
Libona		1 Jul 1956	3.2%	48,965	43,969	+2.07%	374.37	144.55	130	340	14	8°20′05″N 124°44′37″E
Malaybalay	†	19 Oct 1907	12.4%	190,712	174,625	+1.69%	969.19	374.21	200	520	46	8°09′19″N 125°07′49″E
Malitbog		25 Jun 1963	1.7%	26,741	24,453	+1.72%	581.85	224.65	46	120	11	8°32′11″N 124°52′45″E
Manolo Fortich		21 Jun 1957	7.3%	113,200	100,210	+2.35%	413.60	159.69	270	700	22	8°21′57″N 124°51′49″E
Maramag		1 Jul 1956	7.0%	108,293	102,089	+1.13%	447.26	172.69	240	620	20	7°45′40″N 125°00′17″E
Pangantucan		25 Jun 1963	3.7%	56,580	53,126	+1.21%	461.72	178.27	120	310	19	7°49′56″N 124°49′42″E
Quezon		18 Jun 1966	7.1%	109,624	104,116	+0.99%	626.86	242.03	170	440	31	7°43′51″N 125°06′00″E
San Fernando		18 Jun 1966	4.1%	63,045	56,138	+2.23%	705.06	272.23	89	230	24	7°55′00″N 125°19′43″E
Sumilao		1 Jul 1956	1.9%	29,531	27,660	+1.25%	196.95	76.04	150	390	10	8°19′37″N 124°58′40″E
Talakag		22 Feb 1917	5.0%	77,027	71,644	+1.39%	786.40	303.63	98	250	29	8°13′56″N 124°36′13″E
Valencia City	∗	16 Jan 1961	14.0%	216,546	192,993	+2.22%	587.29	226.75	370	960	31	7°54′10″N 125°05′23″E
Total				1,541,308	1,415,226	+1.64%	10,498.59	4,053.53	150	390	464	(see GeoGroup box)
1. Coordinates mark the city/town center, and are sortable by latitude.

=== Barangays ===
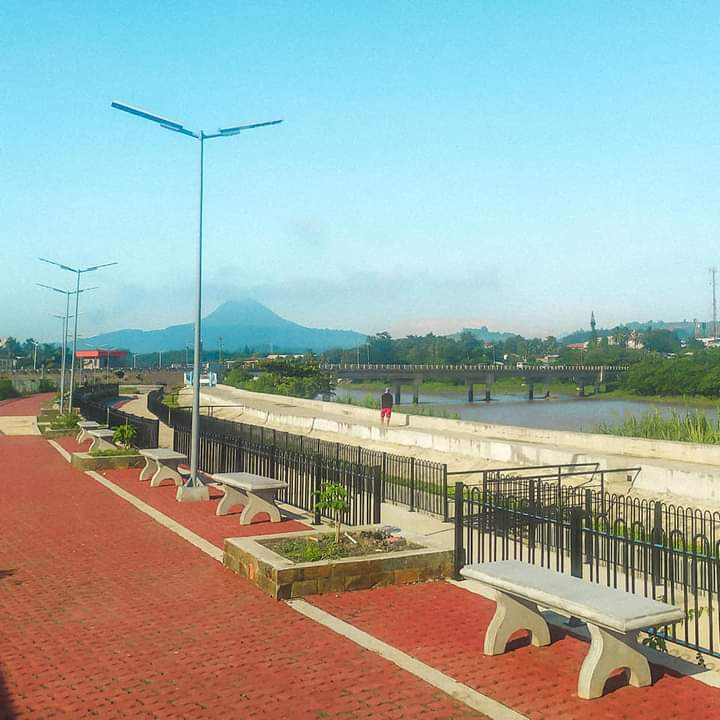
Pulangi Riverside Boulevard

The province has 464 barangays under its jurisdiction. The table below shows the Top 20 Largest Barangays according to population.

Rank	Barangay	City/Municipality	Population (2015)
1	Poblacion	Valencia	35,793
2	Casisang	Malaybalay City	25,696
3	Lumbo	Valencia	16,082
4	Poblacion	Quezon	15,247
5	North Poblacion	Maramag	14,799
6	Dologon	Maramag	14,093
7	Butong	Quezon	13,258
8	South Poblacion	Maramag	12,165
9	Damilag	Manolo Fortich	11,713
10	Batangan	Valencia	11,550
11	Kisolon	Sumilao	11,532
12	Don Carlos Sur (Poblacion)	Don Carlos	11,385
13	Poblacion	Impasugong	11,279
14	Poblacion	Pangantucan	10,970
15	Bagontaas	Valencia	10,619
16	Halapitan (Poblacion)	San Fernando	10,221
17	Agusan Canyon	Manolo Fortich	11,385
18	Sumpong	Malaybalay	9,302
19	Alae	Manolo Fortich	9,135
20	Barangay 9 (Poblacion)	Malaybalay	9,033

=== Legislative districts ===
Bukidnon has four legislative districts namely the first, second, third and fourth districts.

Legislative District	City/Municipality	Land Area	Population (2015)	Density (2010)
1st District	Municipalities: Baungon, Libona, Malitbog, Manolo Fortich, Sumilao and Talakag	2,229.17 km^{2}	302,272	125.14 person/km^{2}
2nd District	City: Malaybalay City; Municipalities: Cabanglasan, Impasugong, Lantapan and San Fernando	3,144.44 km^{2}	374,395	106.60 person/km^{2}
3rd District	Municipalities: Damulog, Dangcagan, Don Carlos, Kadingilan, Kibawe, Kitaotao, Maramag and Quezon	1,816.11 km^{2}	450,839	228.08 person/km^{2}
4th District	City: Valencia; Municipalities: Kalilangan and Pangantucan	1,104.06 km^{2}	287,720	244.71 person/km^{2}

== Demographics ==
Population census of Bukidnon

Year	Pop.	±% p.a.
1903	21,163	—
1918	46,519	+5.39%
1939	57,561	+1.02%
1948	63,470	+1.09%
1960	194,368	+9.77%
1970	414,762	+7.86%
1975	532,818	+5.15%
1980	631,634	+3.46%

Year	Pop.	±% p.a.
1990	843,891	+2.94%
1995	940,403	+2.05%
2000	1,060,415	+2.61%
2007	1,190,284	+1.61%
2010	1,299,192	+3.24%
2015	1,415,226	+1.64%
2020	1,541,308	+1.81%
2024	1,601,902	+0.93%

Source: Philippine Statistics Authority

Based on the 2024 census, Bukidnon has a total population of 1,601,902 residents.

In the 2000 census, males slightly edge the females with 546,234, accounting for about 52% of the province's total population while females, with 514,181, account about 48%. Based on age distribution, Bukidnon has a fairly young population, with ages 14 and below accounting 42.15% or 446, 952. The 15-34 age bracket account for 33.68% of the province's population or 357,112. Ages 55 and above barely accounts 6.5% of the total. The average population growth rate of the province is 2.05% (2.03% if exponential) from 2000 to 2010. Male-to-female ratio in the province stood at 1.06.

=== Population density ===
The average population density for the province is 128 persons per square km. The cities/municipalities with the highest population densities are the following: Don Carlos (353/km^{2}), Kitaotao (250/km^{2}), Valencia (244/km^{2}), Maramag (213/km^{2}) and Quezon (202/km^{2}). The cities/municipalities with the lowest densities, on the other hand are: Impasugong (29/km^{2}), Talakag (58/km^{2}), San Fernando (63/km^{2}), Malitbog (75/km^{2}) and Damulog (83/km^{2}).

=== Population by congressional districts ===
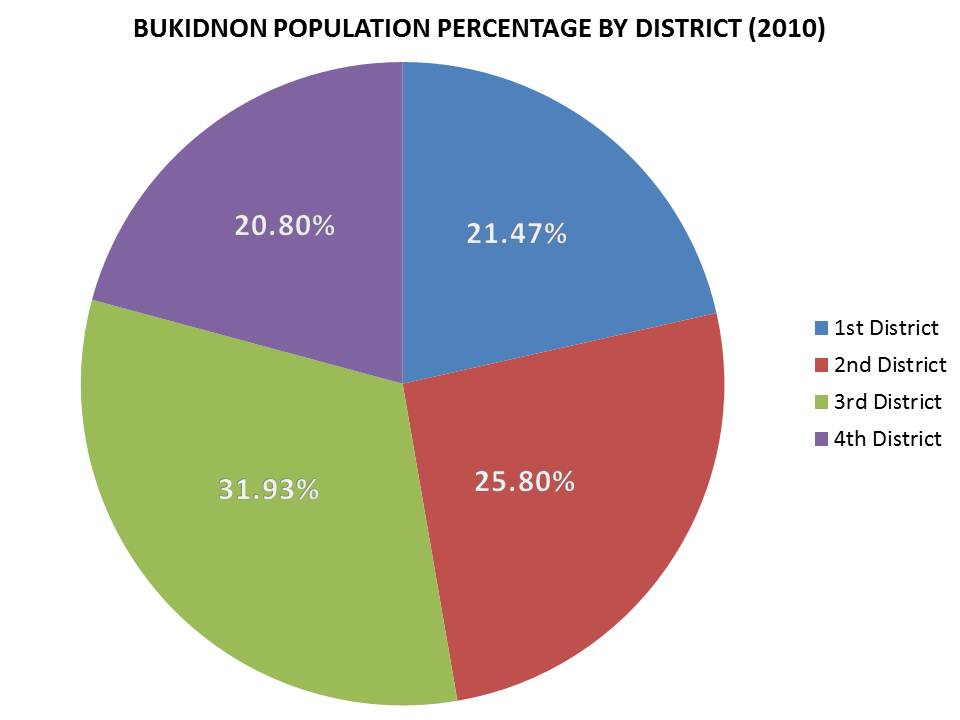
Population percentage by District (2010)

District III has the highest population among the four provincial congressional districts, with 31.86% of the total population of the province. It is followed by District II with 26.45% of the total population and District I with a population share of 21.36%. The least populated district is District IV with population percentage share of 20.33%.

Valencia has the highest population among the cities/municipalities of the province with 192,993 inhabitants, accounting 13.64% of the province's total. It is closely followed by Malaybalay with 174,625 inhabitants or 12.34% of the provincial population. Quezon is at third with 104,116 inhabitants or 7.36% of the total, with Maramag and Manolo Fortich rounding out the fourth and fifth with 102,089 and 100,210 inhabitants, respectively.

The four largest local government units of Bukidnon (Valencia, Malaybalay, Quezon, and Maramag) are clustered together in the central part of the province. It is also in the national roads of these cities/municipalities that daily road use volume are high.

=== Languages ===
Languages Spoken (2010)
Language	Speakers
Cebuano/Bisaya	734,848
Higaonon	154,295
Hiligaynon	119,133
Binukid/Bukidnon	76,812
Talaandig	55,757
Ilocano	26,954
Matigsalug	18,263
Others	108,815

The lingua franca of the region is Cebuano. Minority languages include Higaonon, Bukid, Ilianen, Matigsalug, Hiligaynon, Maranao, Maguindanao, Iranun, Ilocano, and Waray. and Tagalog

=== Ethnicity ===
Bukidnon's population by ethnic origin (2000)

According to ethnicity, majority of the people in Bukidnon are Cebuanos accounting for approximately 41% of the total population. The Bukidnon Lumads (Bukidnon, Higaonon, Manobo, Talaandig, etc.) account for about 24% of the total population of the province. The Maranaos form about 8% of the total population followed by the Hiligaynon/Ilonggo and Boholano groups with 12.7% and 7.37%, respectively, of the province's total population. The rest consists of Iranuns, Maguindanaons, Bicolanos, Ilocanos, Ivatans, Karay-a, Kapampangans, Pangasinans, Sambals, and Warays.

Indigenous inhabitants of Bukidnon are the Lumad peoples, including the Bukidnon, Higaonon, Manobo, and Talaandig. Their cultures and traditions are embodied in oral folk literature of the province, which are classified into; antoka (riddles), basahan (proverbs or wise sayings), kaliga (ceremonial songs), limbay (lyric poem), sala (love song), idangdang (ballad), ulaging (epic), and nanangon (folktales). Religion is monotheistic. They believe in one God. Magbabaya (the ruler of all) has minor gods and goddesses under his command (Example: Bulalakaw watches rivers and lakes, Tumpas Nanapiyaw or Itumbangol watches the bases of the earth, night, and day).

Many of the province's inhabitants, however, are descendants of immigrants from Cebu or elsewhere in Central Visayas.

=== Religion ===
Religion in Bukidnon
Religion	percentage
Roman Catholic	80.7%
Protestant (other Christians)	15%
Islam	4%

==== Catholicism ====
The majority of the population are Christians (predominantly Roman Catholic, 80.7%).

==== Others ====
Significant other Christian denomination minority at 15%, followed by Islam (4%), and other religious groups comprising 0.3%. Ethnic religion is still in practice by native Lumads across the province.

== Economy ==
Poverty incidence of Bukidnon (%)

Source: Philippine Statistics Authority

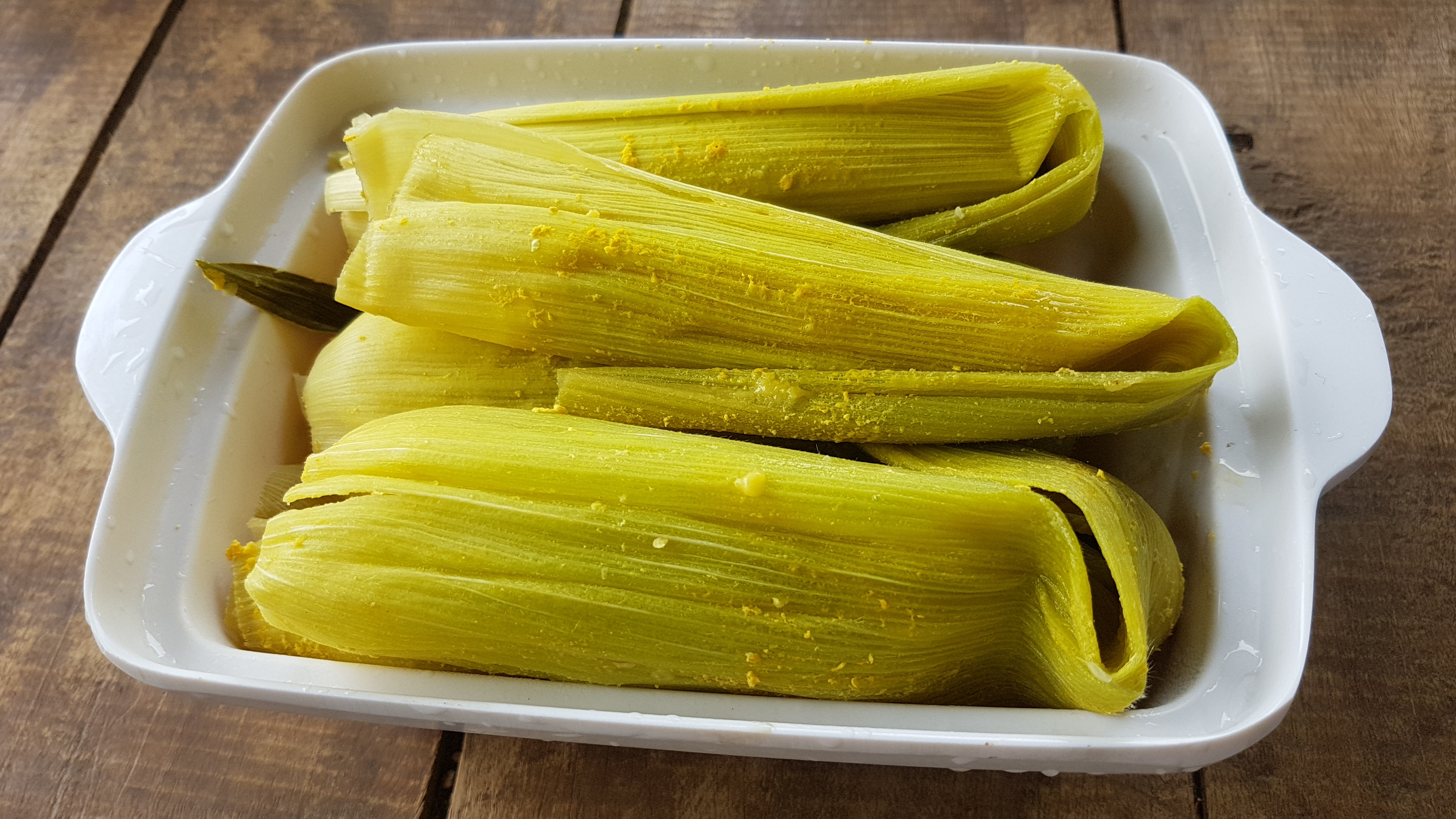
Binaki, a type of steamed corn cake wrapped with corn husks is believed to have originated in Bukidnon

Bukidnon is an agricultural economy. It is a major producer of rice, maize, sugar, coffee, rubber, pineapple, banana, tomato, flowers, cassava, and other fruits and vegetables. Almost all large firms operating in the province are into production or processing of these agricultural products. Recognized by the Food and Agriculture Organization as a foot-and-mouth disease-free province, it is also a major producer of poultry, hogs, goats, and cattle.

The Philippine Carabao Center's outlet in Central Mindanao University makes dairy products from water buffalos. Due to being landlocked, Bukidnon relies on the nearby cities of Cagayan de Oro and Davao for the supply of marine products. However, the province has its own supply of freshwater products such as tilapia, carp, catfish, mudfish, gourami, barb, goby, climbing perch, freshwater eels, giant freshwater prawn or shrimps, native freshwater snails or freshwater clams, and freshwater crabs, either via inland fishing or fry production aquaculture in inland fish farms and fish hatcheries.

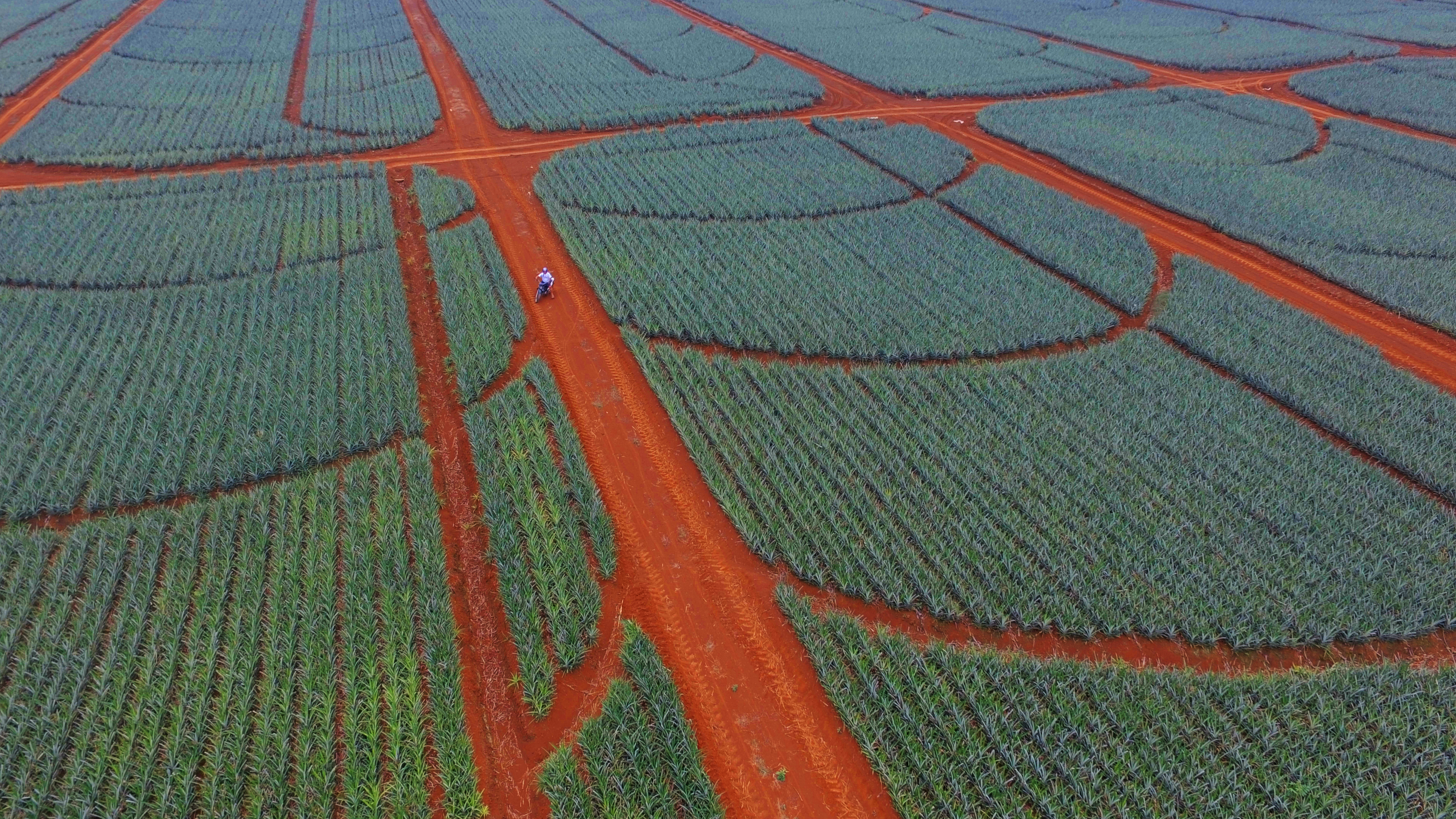
Del Monte Pineapple fields in Manolo Fortich

Del Monte Philippines, Inc. (DMPI), Lapanday Diversified Products Corp. and Mt. Kitanglad Agri-Development Corporation are engaged in pineapple production. Dole Philippines (Skyland) and Mt. Kitanglad Agri-Ventures, Inc. are into banana production. DMPI is also engaged in cattle fattening. Bukidnon Sugar Milling Corporation (BUSCO) and Crystal Sugar Milling are into sugar milling and refining.

Phil-Agro Industrial Corporation is in starch production. Menzi Agricultural Development is in cacao production. Agaropyta Phils. Inc., Bukidnon Greens Inc., FP Obrero Farms and ARDEM, Inc. are in cut-flower production.

Food manufacturing giants, San Miguel Foods Corp. (SMPFCI), Monterey Farms Corp., Swift Foods, Inc. have intensified their contract breeding and growing operations in the province. Valencia Rubbertex, Inc., an 80-20 Japanese-Filipino joint venture produces rubber boots and rubber shoes for Japan.

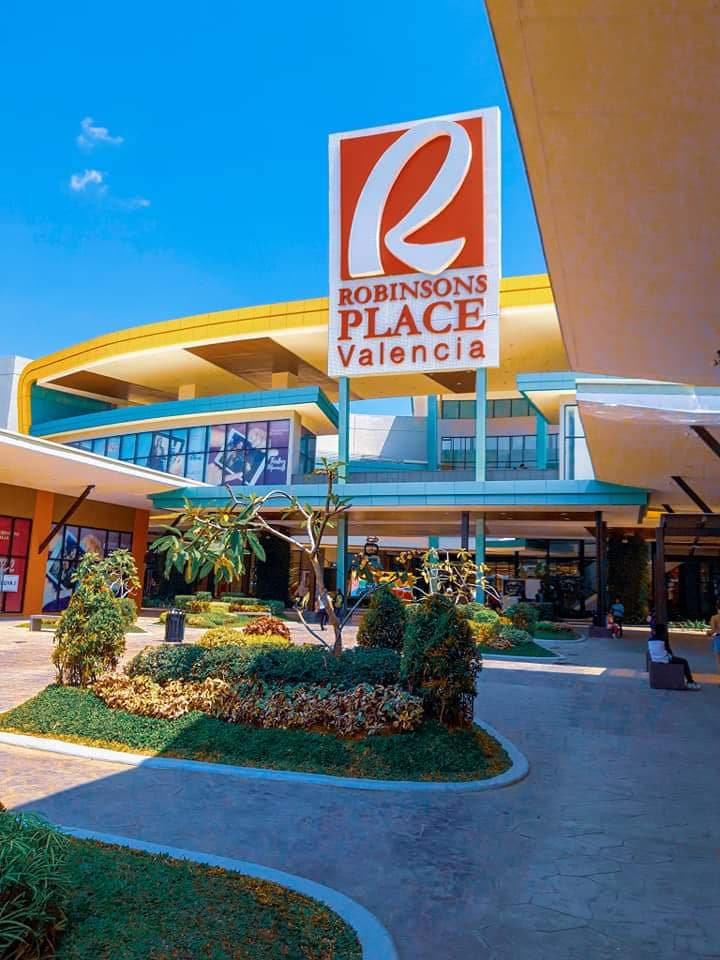
Robinsons Place Valencia

As one of the major anchors in crop production, Bukidnon is moving forward towards establishing its position as a principal trader of rice, corn, sugar, potato, tomato and many other commercial and industrial crops. As the second largest producer of corn in the country, it reached a total production of 481,370 metric tons. In year 2000, vast tracts of cornfields, rice paddles, and sugar plantations are distributed all over the province.

Bukidnon has already assumed its role as producer and supplier of fresh fruits and vegetables. These produce are either sold in domestic markets or exported to Japan and other neighboring countries. Fresh pineapples, banana, sugarcane and cut flowers grown over the years are among its exports. New agri-business industries are still growing such as strawberry farming. Even export of rubber boots and shoes, an infant industry in the province is increasing tremendously.

A wide variety of resource-based handicrafts is extensively produced from rattan, bamboo, and wood. San Fernando is known for its rattan furniture. Bamboo baskets, wood wares and carvings, mats, and other handmade products are ideal souvenir items.

=== Bukidnon Investment Grid ===
During the mid-1990s, the provincial government of Bukidnon, after careful studies and consultation, has adopted a strategic program called the Bukidnon Investment Grid or BIG. This program is aimed to confine all its investment promotion activities and projects to the strip of land three kilometers from both sides of the Sayre Highway from Damulog to Manolo Fortich, and along the national/provincial road from Kibawe to Kadingilan; Don Carlos to Kadingilan; Maramag to Quezon; Maramag to Kadingilan; Kadingilan to Pangantucan; Valencia City to San Fernando; Malaybalay City to Cabanglasan; Malaybalay to Lantapan; Manolo Fortich to Libona; Libona to Cagayan de Oro; Talakag to Pangantucan; and Malitbog to Tagoloan in Misamis Oriental.

== Transportation ==
The province is very well accessible by road primarily from the cities of Cagayan de Oro and Davao with alternate road networks as well from the cities of Butuan (via Agusan del Sur), Iligan (via Talakag), Marawi (via Talakag), Tagum (via San Fernando), and the province of Cotabato.

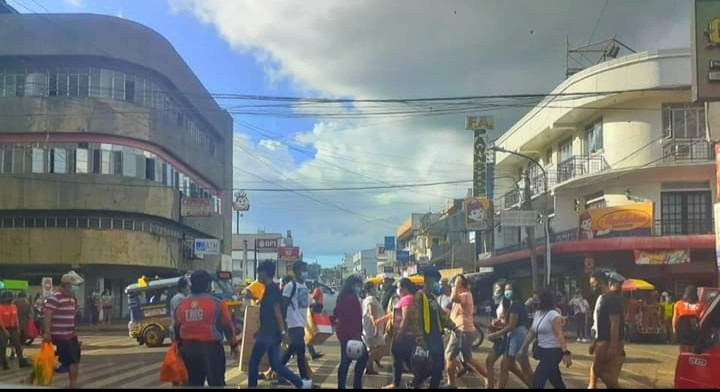
Sayre Highway in Malaybalay City

The entire province is bisected from north to south by the four-lane Sayre Highway from Cagayan de Oro to Kabacan, Cotabato via Maramag (Bukidnon–Cotabato Road); and by the two-to-four lane Bukidnon–Davao Road (colloquially known as "BuDa") from Quezon to Davao City. Both are components of National Route 10 (N10) of the Philippine highway network, and a spur of the Asian Highway 26 (AH26) of the Asian highway network. The Sayre Highway intersects with the BuDa Road in the barrio of Dologon in Maramag, where it changes to route N943 and continues on to Dangcagan, Damulog, and Kabacan. The planned Central Mindanao Expressway will allow drivers to avoid Sayre Highway.

The Sayre Highway (formerly "Route 3") was renamed in honor of Francis Bowes Sayre, Sr., the U.S. Philippine High Commissioner who spearheaded its construction during the American occupation of the Philippines.

There are several airstrips in the province being used by private firms. Commercial flights used to be flown from the Malaybalay Airstrip, but it was closed down by the provincial government in the late 1990s. The airport where it used to be located was converted into a low-cost housing project. A proposed domestic airport site in the municipality of Don Carlos has already been on the talks since 2008 and in 2013, the Bukidnon Airport Development Project proposal was finalized. Budget allocation was done in 2017 and construction started in 2018. There are no seaports in Bukidnon because the province is landlocked. The nearest passenger seaport is in Cagayan de Oro.

== Education ==
=== Universities and colleges ===
The following universities and colleges of Bukidnon are the tertiary schools.

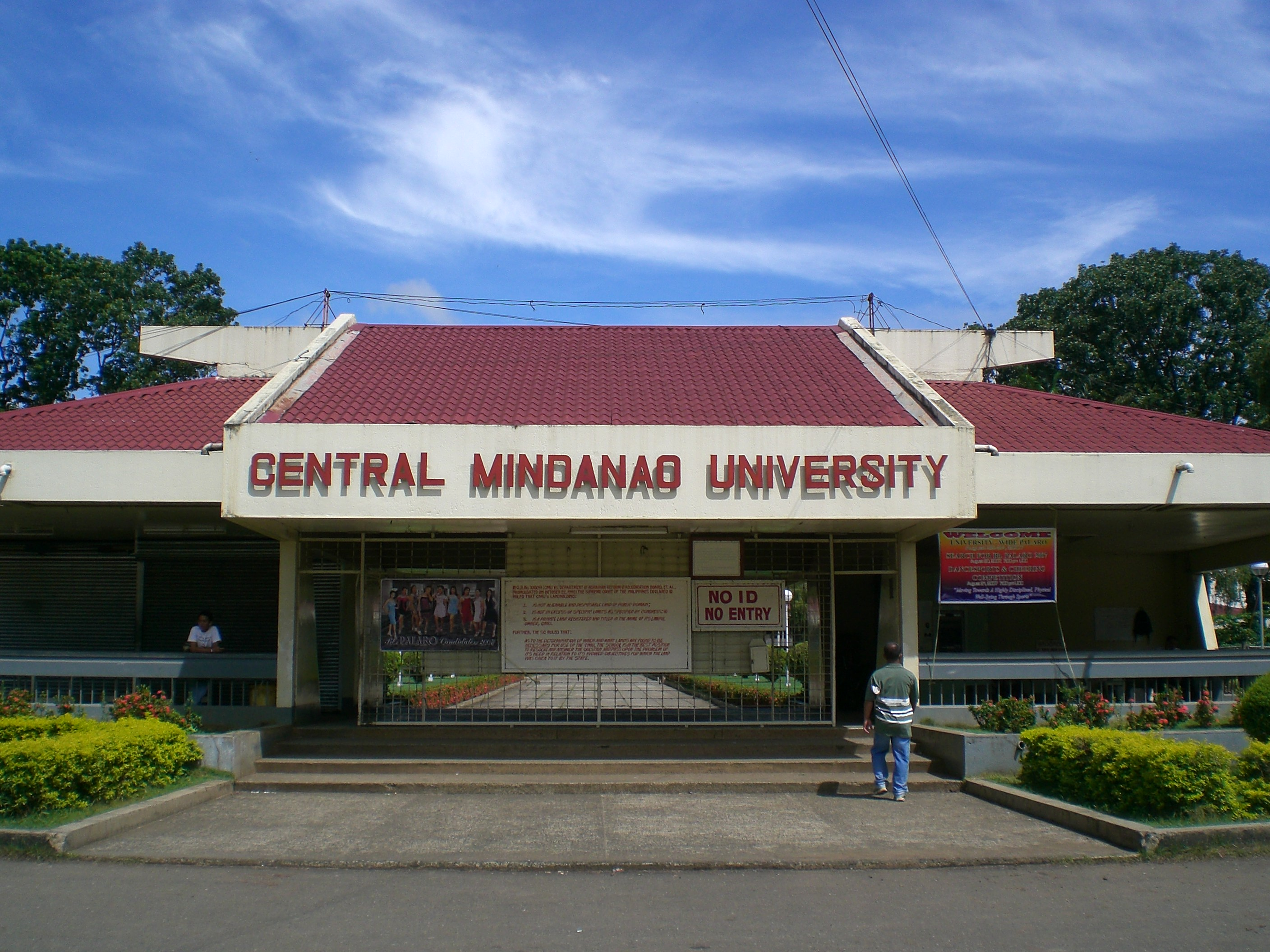
Main entrance to the Central Mindanao University grounds

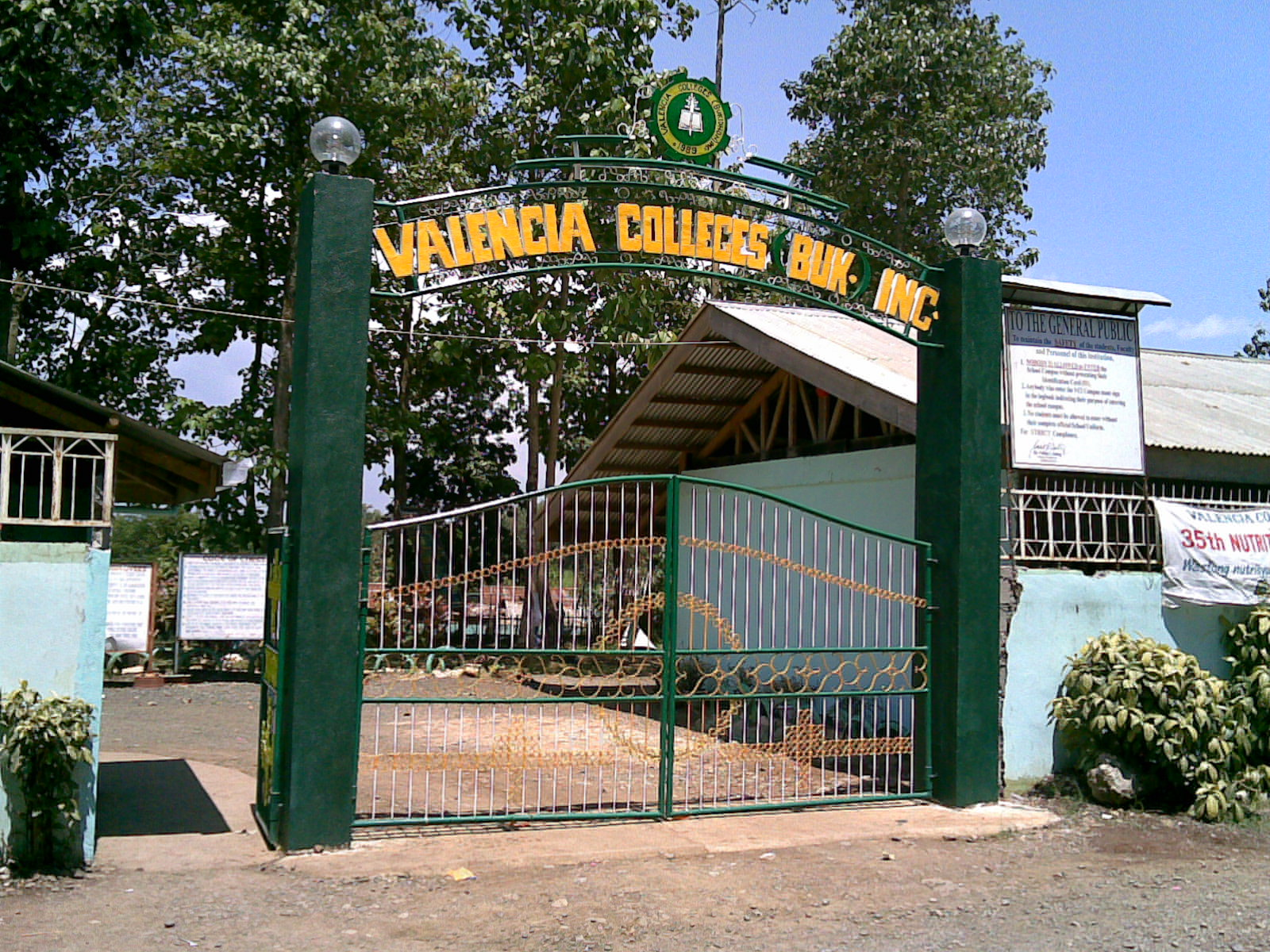
Valencia Colleges (Bukidnon), Inc.

School	Location
ACLC College of Bukidnon	Hagkol, Valencia
Bukidnon State University	Malaybalay
Central Mindanao University	Musuan, Maramag, Bukidnon
Don Carlos Polytechnic College	Poblacion, Don Carlos, Bukidnon
IBA College of Mindanao	Valencia, Bukidnon
Maramag Polytechnic College	North Poblacion, Maramag, Bukidnon
Mindanao Arts and Technological Institute	Malaybalay
Mountain View College	MVC Complex, Mt. Nebo, Valencia
Northern Bukidnon State College	Manolo Fortich, Bukidnon
Philippine College Foundation	Valencia, Bukidnon
Philippine Countryville College	Maramag, Bukidnon
Quezon Institute of Technology, Inc.	Quezon, Bukidnon
San Agustin Institute of Technology	Valencia
San Isidro College	Impalambong, Malaybalay
STI College	Malaybalay City and Valencia
St. James School of Science and Technology	Malaybalay
Valencia Colleges (Bukidnon), Inc.	Valencia

== Festivals ==
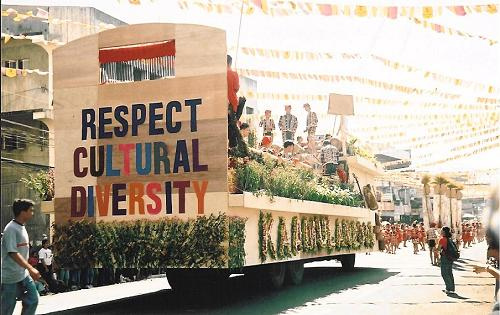
A Kaamulan float

The province celebrates the Kaamulan Festival, an ethnic cultural festival held annually in Malaybalay, Bukidnon from the mid-February up to March 10, the founding date of the Bukidnon as a province in 1917. It is held to celebrate the culture and tradition of the seven ethnic tribal groups—Bukidnon, Higaonon, Talaandig, Manobo, Matigsalug, Tigwahanon, and Umayamnon—that originally inhabit the province. Kaamulan comes from the indigenous Binukid word amul meaning "to gather". Kaamulan is gathering for a purpose—a datuship ritual, a wedding ceremony, a thanksgiving festival during harvest time, a peace pact, or all of these together. The festival started in 1974 and is celebrated until now. It is the only authentic ethnic festival in the Philippines.

== Bukidnon Hymn: Bukidnon My Home ==
The Provincial Hymn was composed by Filomeno Bautista between 1925 and 1932. Nimecio Jun Beltran authored a provincial resolution requiring the singing of the provincial hymn in all and every events in the province of Bukidnon where the Philippine National Anthem is also sung.

Official Binukid Version:
Bukidnon Kanak Ha Banuwa

Bisan pa hindu a
Lalag ku'g uli a
Dini ta Bukidnun
Kanak ha banuwa
Buntud ha matangkaw,
Kalasan...makupal,
Patag ha malu-ag,
Ha tungkay madagway.

Chorus:

Bunturan, balalayan
Basakan, kapatagan
Pastuhan, kapinyahan
Alan-alan kauyagan
Langit din piglambungan
Pig-aldawan kalamagan
Singenem uranan
Alan-alan kaayaran

Official English- version:
Bukidnon My Home

Wherever I may roam
The distant lands to see
I long to go back home
To sweet Bukidnon home
Her lovely mountains high
Her forests old and grand
Bring memories to me
The home I long to see.

Chorus:
There my heart, yearns to be
In far away, Bukidnon land.
Under its blue starry sky,
Where love and joy never die.
(Repeat Chorus)

Unofficial Cebuano Version:
Bukidnon Matahum

Bisan asa kita
Sa hakayong dapit
Mobalik gihapon
sa atong Bukidnon

Nindot ang Kabukiran
Lunhaw'ng Kalasangan
Tam-is palandungon
Yuta ko'ng matahum

KORUS:

Dughan ko nagahandum
Sa yuta ko nga Bukidnon
May Kahayag ug Kalinaw
Gugma'g kalipay sa kanunay

(Balik KORUS)

== Notable people ==
- Gerald Tabios - elite endurance athlete
- Elenito Galido - Bishop of the Diocese of Iligan
- Joey Ayala - singer-songwriter and composer
- Migz Zubiri - politician
- Nelbert Omolon - PBA Player
- Nereus Acosta - politician
- Sheree (real name Sweet Faye V. Bautista) - Singer / dancer / model & actress (former Viva Hot Babe)
- Virgilio Garcillano - former government official
- Mario Fernandez – a multi-medalist national boxer
- Teofisto Guingona III – politician/former senator
- Archie Gamboa - 21st Chief of the Philippine National Police
- Manny Pacquiao – Filipino professional boxer and senator born in Kibawe

== See also ==
- Kitanglad Mountain Range
