= Bukidnon, My Home =

Provincial anthem of Bukidnon

- Provincial anthem of Bukidnon
- Also known as: Bukidnon Kanak Ha Banuwa; Bukidnon Hymn
- Lyrics: Filomeno M. Bautista (original English lyrics), 1925-1932
- Music: Filomeno M. Bautista, 1925-1932
- Adopted: September 16, 2014

"Bukidnon, My Home" (Binukid: Bukidnon Kanak Ha Banuwa), also known as the Bukidnon Hymn, is the official anthem of the province of Bukidnon in the Philippines.

== History ==
"Bukidnon, My Home" was first composed and written by Filomeno M. Bautista, a local historian, between 1925 and 1932. Written during the American colonial period, the song's use of English at a time when the English language root had begun to firmly take root in the Philippines was indicative of American colonial dominance both in the Philippines and in Bukidnon more specifically.

Lyrics in Binukid, the province's largest native language, later appeared sometime in the 1930s. While commonly attributed to Prudencio Caterial, it has also been claimed that the true author of the Binukid lyrics is unknown.

The song was commonly sung in schools for many years, but it was not accorded official status until 2006, when the Sangguniang Panlalawigan of Bukidnon passed a resolution requiring "Bukidnon, My Home" to be sung both in schools and at provincial government offices. In 2014, a subsequent ordinance was passed officially adopting the song as the provincial anthem.

== Lyrics ==
Although "Bukidnon, My Home" was originally written in English with three verses and a chorus, only the first verse (shown in bold) and the chorus are commonly sung. In the Binukid version, these were the only verses translated into the language, with no translation for the other two verses, although Edmund Industan, a local blogger, has called for an official Binukid translation to be made for the remaining verses.

Original English version
Bukidnon, My Home
penned by Filomeno M. Bautista
Binukid version
Bukidnon Kanak Ha Banuwa
translated by Prudencio Caterial
Translation of the Binukid version
translated by Arlene Yandug and Lumin Sario

**Wherever I may roam**
**the distant land to see,**
**I long to go back soon**
**to sweet Bukidnon home,**

**Her lovely mountains high**
**with forest [sic] old and grand,**
**Bring memories to me**
**the home I long to see.**

Chorus:
𝄆 There my heart yearns to be
In far away Bukidnon land
Under its blue starry skies
Where love and joy never die. 𝄇

The broad and green plateaus,
The rivers winding through;
My heart doth long no more of,
Wonders of the world;

The balmy gentle wind,
That kiss the travelers brow;
Will blow and ever blow,
Wherever I may go.

Chorus

The silver water falls,
In distance one can see;
In beauty they express,
The strangers sincere praise.

The long and zigzag roads,
The canyons deep and wide;
Will ever be enshrined,
In all Bukidnon mind.

Chorus

Bisan pa hinduh ah
Lalag ko'g uli ah,
Dini ta Bukidnon
Kanak ha banuwa

Buntod matatangkaw
Kalasan, makupal
Patag ha maluag
Hatungkay madagway

Kuros:
Bunturan, balalayan,
basakan, kapatagan
Pastuhan, kapinyahan,
alan-alan kauyagan
Langit din piglambungan
Pig-aldawan, kalamagan
Singanam uranan
Ba alan-alan kauyagan

Wherever I may roam
I long to go back
Here in Bukidnon
My home.

High mountains
Thick forest
Vast plains,
Very lovely.

Chorus:
Mountains, houses,
Rice fields, plains,
Pastureland, pineapple farms,
All [are] means of living.
Its sky shaded,
Sunlit, windblown
Sometimes rain-soaked,
But all are means of living.

The lyrics have been interpreted as invoking a strong feeling of nostalgia for Bukidnon, mostly through reminding people of the province's climate and natural environment.

== Performance and use ==
In 2009, it was proposed by a member of the Provincial Board that the song be performed after "Lupang Hinirang", the Philippine national anthem, at all events in the province of Bukidnon.
