= Robert Edward Lucero =

Robert Eduard M. Lucero
- Military career
- Allegiance: Philippines
- Branch: Philippine Army
- Rank: Captain
- Nickname: Bakal ("Steel")
- Service number: O-9713
- Commands: 6th Scout Ranger Company, 1st Scout Ranger Regiment
- Conflicts: Moro conflict
- Awards: Medal of Valor

Robert Edward M. Lucero was a Philippine Army officer and a posthumous recipient the Philippines' highest military award for courage, the Medal of Valor.

== Military education ==
Lucero was a graduate of the Philippine Military Academy Class of 1987.

== Action against the MILF ==
Captain Lucero was the commanding officer of the 6th Scout Ranger Company of the 1st Scout Ranger Regiment deployed in Carmen, Cotabato, Philippines on 7 April 1996 when his unit was ordered to reinforce the 60th Infantry Battalion of the Philippine Army which had been securing the Malitubog-Maridagao government irrigation project site. The government forces had been attacked by approximately 400 Moro Islamic Liberation Front rebels.

Lucero led two platoons to the relief of the beleaguered Army soldiers and engaged the Moro rebels in a 9-hour firefight. During the course of the battle, he sustained a head wound from sniper fire. He eventually fell unconscious and was killed in action.

=== Medal of Valor citation ===
CAPTAIN ROBERT EDUARD M LUCERO O-9713 PHILIPPINE ARMY
Carmen, Cotabato - 7 April 1996

"For acts of conspicuous courage, gallantry and intrepidity at the risk of his life above and beyond the call of duty while serving as Commanding Officer of the 6th Scout Ranger Company, First Scout Ranger Regiment, Philippine Army during a fierce nine-hour encounter against more or less 400 Moro Islamic Liberation Front rebels who attacked the government troops securing the MALMAR project site in Carmen, North Cotabato at vicinity Barangay Sinepetan, Carmen on or about 070530 to 071500 April 1996.

Called upon to reinforce the beleaguered troops of the 60th Infantry Battalion who incurred several wounded, CAPTAIN LUCERO heeded the distress call and immediately led two platoons into the encounter site. Aware of numerically superior enemy who have entrenched themselves into good fighting positions and of their overwhelming firepower and despite his company's lack of crew-served weapons and artillery fire support due to constraints posed by their location and the prevailing weather, he nevertheless advanced to the position of the Muslim extremists and fiercely engaged them while directing his other platoon to seize a vantage ground.

Undaunted by the heavy volume of machine gun and mortar fires coming from the enemy, he audaciously exchanged fire with the terrorists at close range, rallied his men and shot dead a number of outlaws. Disregarding his personal safety, he swiftly assaulted pockets of enemy positions one after another to relieve his other platoon from the brunt of the enemy firepower. He saved its elements from imminent annihilation and led his men to counter the maneuvers of the Muslim extremists who were determined to encircle their position.

Displaying utmost stability and maintaining control, CAPTAIN LUCERO designated fields of fire of his men and this effectively stunned and momentarily repelled the wave-by-wave attack of the enemy. Amidst the intense exchange of fires, a sniper hit him in the head, wounding him critically. However, despite his severe bleeding and diminished strength, he maintained radio contact with his platoon leaders and urged his men to hold ground at all costs. Struggling to fire single shot, he still managed to lob a hand grenade to the enemies who resumed their suicidal advance. He also observed and identified enemy sniper positions and machine-gun nests and ordered two teams to assault them, a command which his men followed to the letter.

Inspired by his leadership and ultimate self-sacrifice, his men continued to fight ferociously, buying time for the arrival of helicopter gunship and artillery support. Subsequently, the wounded CAPTAIN LUCERO passed out and never regained consciousness. His last heroic stand and that of his men compelled the enemy to withdraw after suffering 29 casualties (body count) among them Commander Mangyan. By these outstanding deeds, CAPTAIN LUCERO exemplified himself in combat in keeping with the finest tradition of Filipino soldiery."
