= Pulangi Dam =

Dam in Bukidnon, Philippines

- Location in Mindanao Location in the Philippines
- Official name: Pulangi IV Hydroelectric Power Station
- Country: Philippines
- Location: Maramag, Bukidnon
- Coordinates: 7°47′11″N 125°1′25″E
- Status: Operational
- Construction began: 1982
- Opening date: 1986
- Owner: National Power Corporation

Dam and spillways
- Type of dam: Gravity/embankment
- Impounds: Pulangi River
- Spillway type: Tainter gate-controlled

Reservoir
- Creates: Pulangi IV Reservoir (upper and lower)
- Active capacity: 67,000,000 m^{3} (54,318 acre⋅ft)
- Catchment area: 18,000 km^{2} (6,950 mi^{2})
- Surface area: 19.85 km^{2} (8 mi^{2})

Pulangi IV Hydroelectric Power Plant
- Coordinates: 7°42′56.70″N 125°01′25.66″E
- Commission date: 1985/86
- Turbines: 3 x 85 MW Francis-type
- Installed capacity: 255 MW

The Pulangi IV Hydroelectric Power Plant, also known as the Pulangi Dam, is located on the Pulangi River near Maramag in Bukidnon province on the island of Mindanao in the Philippines. It uses two reservoirs, produced by damming the Pulangi River, to supply water to a run-of-the-river hydroelectric power plant; the power plant is capable of generating 255 megawatts (342,000 hp) of power. Construction began in 1982; the first two generators became operational in December 1985, with the last generator being commissioned in 1986.

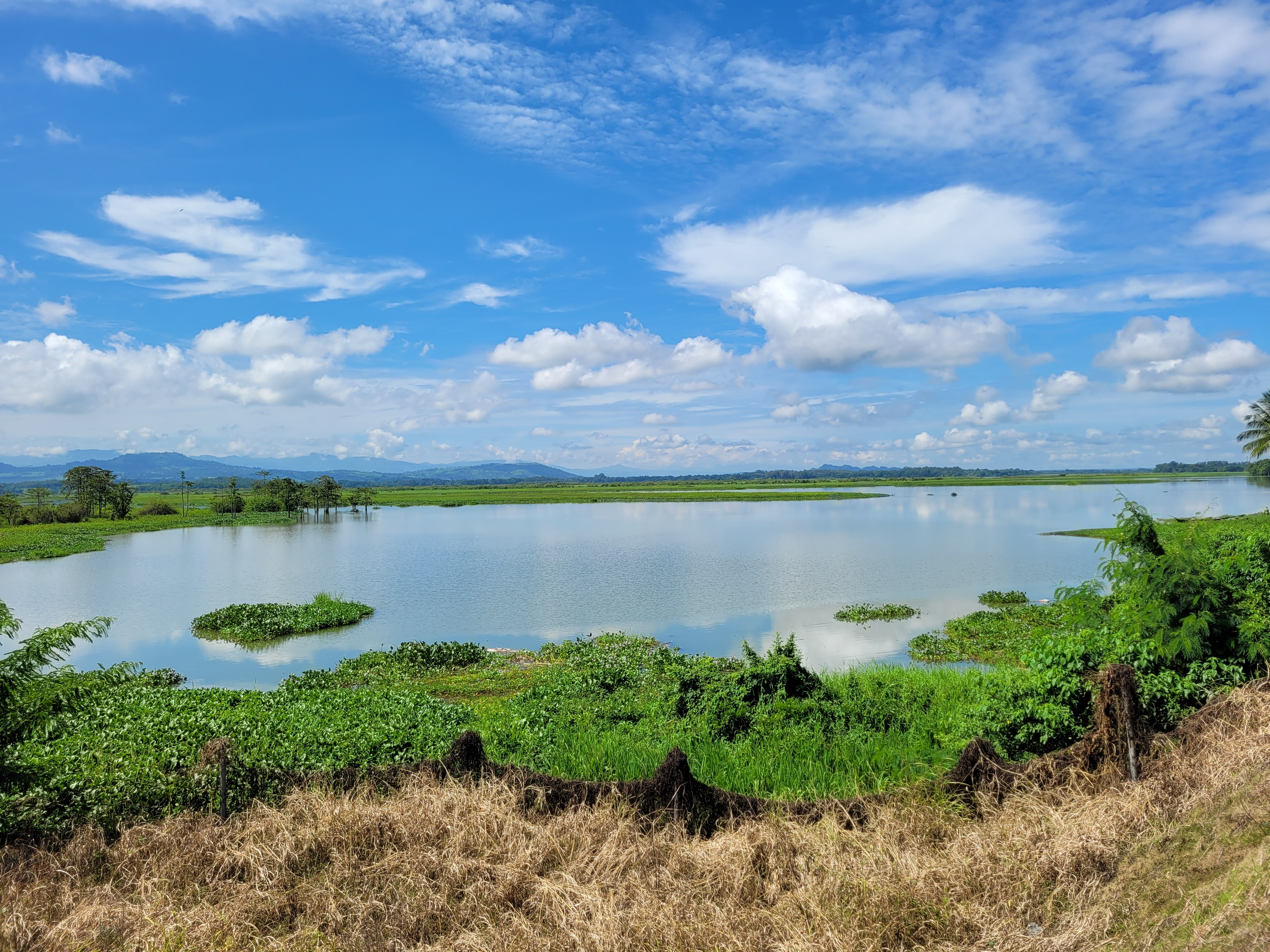
View of the Pulangi Lake in Maramag

The upper (pondage) reservoir located at 7°47′11″N 125°1′25″E diverts water into a power channel which parallels the river until it reaches the lower reservoir (surge pool) at 7°42′56″N 125°1′25″E, 7.5 km (5 mi) to the south. At the lower reservoir, water is fed to each of the three 85 MW (114,000 hp) Francis turbine-generators via a penstock. The Pulangi IV power plant provides 23% of the hydroelectric power generated on Mindanao.

Since operation, the reservoirs associated with the power plant have received an estimated 1,500,000 m^{3} (1,216 acre⋅ft) of sediment annually. Of the reservoir's combined 67,000,000 m^{3} (54,318 acre⋅ft) active capacity, 23,000,000 m^{3} (18,646 acre⋅ft) has been filled with silt. The siltation rate was almost 1 meter annually and caused the dam's reservoir to work at 50% capacity. The unexpected siltation threatens safe operation of the dams and power generation, in addition to drastically shortening the predicted operational lifespan of the dam. At first, the minimum and maximum water levels were raised and, in 2007, dredging work was performed around the head work of the upper reservoir's head. Selective dredging in the upper reservoir began in 2010, and continues as of 2011.

The artificial lake created by the reservoir proper is called the Pulangi Lake or the Maramag Lake.

== See also ==
- Water supply and sanitation in the Philippines
- Energy in the Philippines
