= Kalatungan Mountain Range =

Mountain range in Bukidnon, Philippines

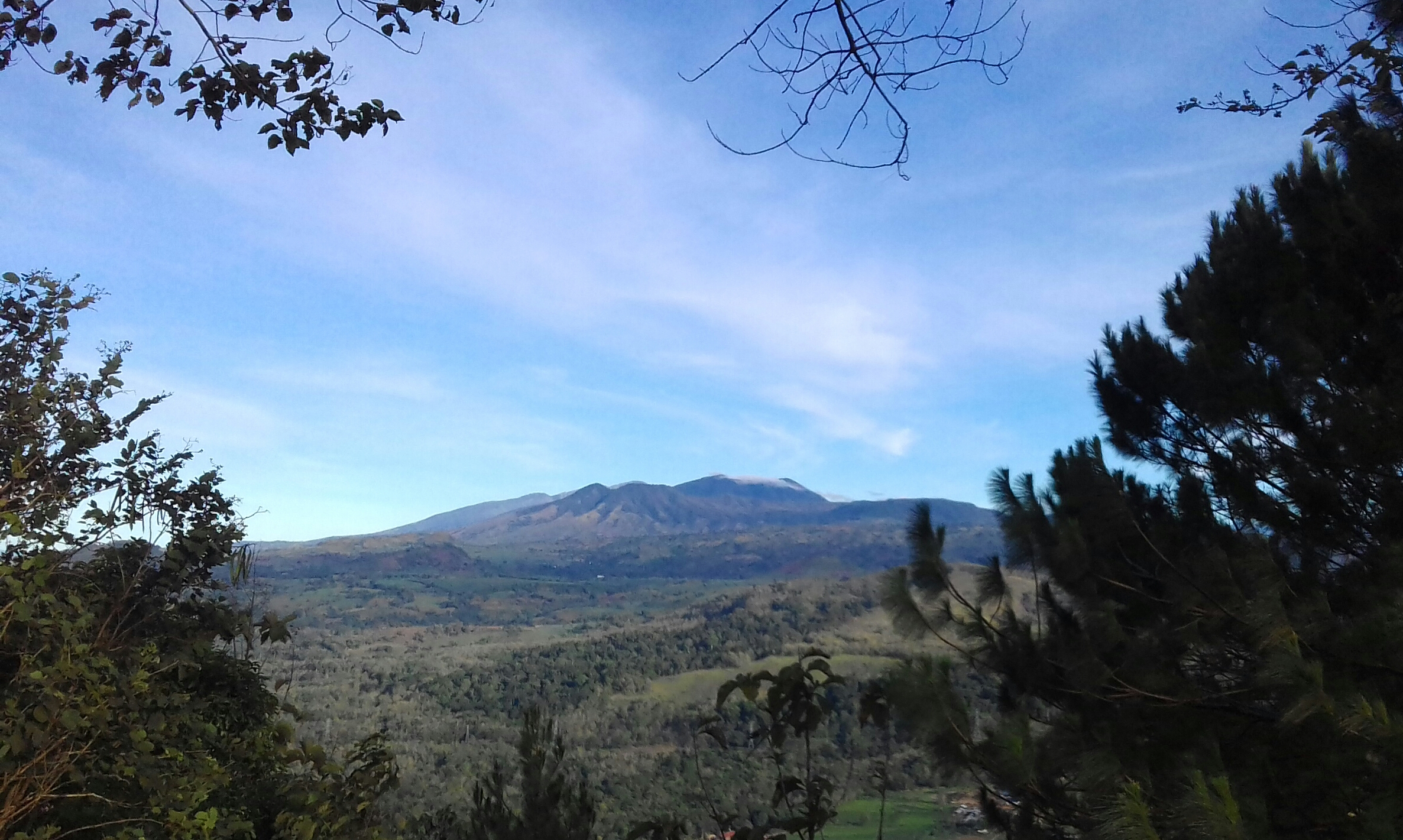
- Kalatungan Mountain Range as seen from Mount Musuan

Highest point
- Peak: Mount Kalatungan
- Elevation: 2,860 m (9,380 ft)
- Coordinates: 7°57′18″N 124°48′09″E

Dimensions
- Length: 38 km (24 mi) east-west
- Width: 19 km (12 mi) north-south
- Area: 213.0134 km^{2} (82.2449 mi^{2})

Geography
- Location within Philippines
- Country: Philippines
- Region: Northern Mindanao
- Province: Bukidnon
- City: Valencia City
- Range coordinates: 8°00′N 124°36′E

The Kalatungan Mountain Range in the central portion of the province of Bukidnon, Philippines, is one of the few areas in the province covered with old growth or mossy forests. It covers an area of approximately 213.0134 km^{2} (82.24493 mi^{2}), with about 113.7175 km^{2} (43.90657 mi^{2}) identified as part of the critical watershed area declared under Presidential Decree 127, issued on June 29, 1987 (Muleta-Manupali Watershed). The water from two rivers, the Muleta and Manupali Rivers, flood the multimillion dam project of the Philippine National Irrigation Administration (NIA). The rivers drain into the Pulangi River, the site of a National Power Corporation hydroelectric dam.

== Geography ==
The mountain range is in the central section of the province of Bukidnon A neighbor of Kitanglad Mountain Range . It lies between the coordinates 8°00’ and 8°60’ latitude and between 124°35’ and 124°60’ longitude. It is bounded on the north by the municipality of Talakag, on the west by the municipality of Lantapan and the city of Valencia, and on the south by the municipality of Pangantucan. Its eastern side is bordered by both Talakag and Pangantucan.

=== Peaks ===
Kalatungan Mountain Range peaks by elevation.

- Mount Kalatungan 9,380 ft (2,860 m)
- Mount Makaupao 9,232 ft (2,814 m)
- Mount Kilakron 7,805 ft (2,379 m)
- Maluso Peak 5,397 ft (1,645 m)
- Itabingon Peak 5,292 ft (1,613 m)

=== Climate ===
The area of the Kalatungan Mountain Range falls under the Type III climate which is characterized as having a short dry season lasting only one to three months and no very pronounced maximum rainy period. Average temperature is 24.7 °C. The area receives its most rainfall in June. The driest month is March. Relative humidity varies from 71% in May to 86% in September. The area is mostly cloud-covered throughout the year.

=== Hydrological features ===
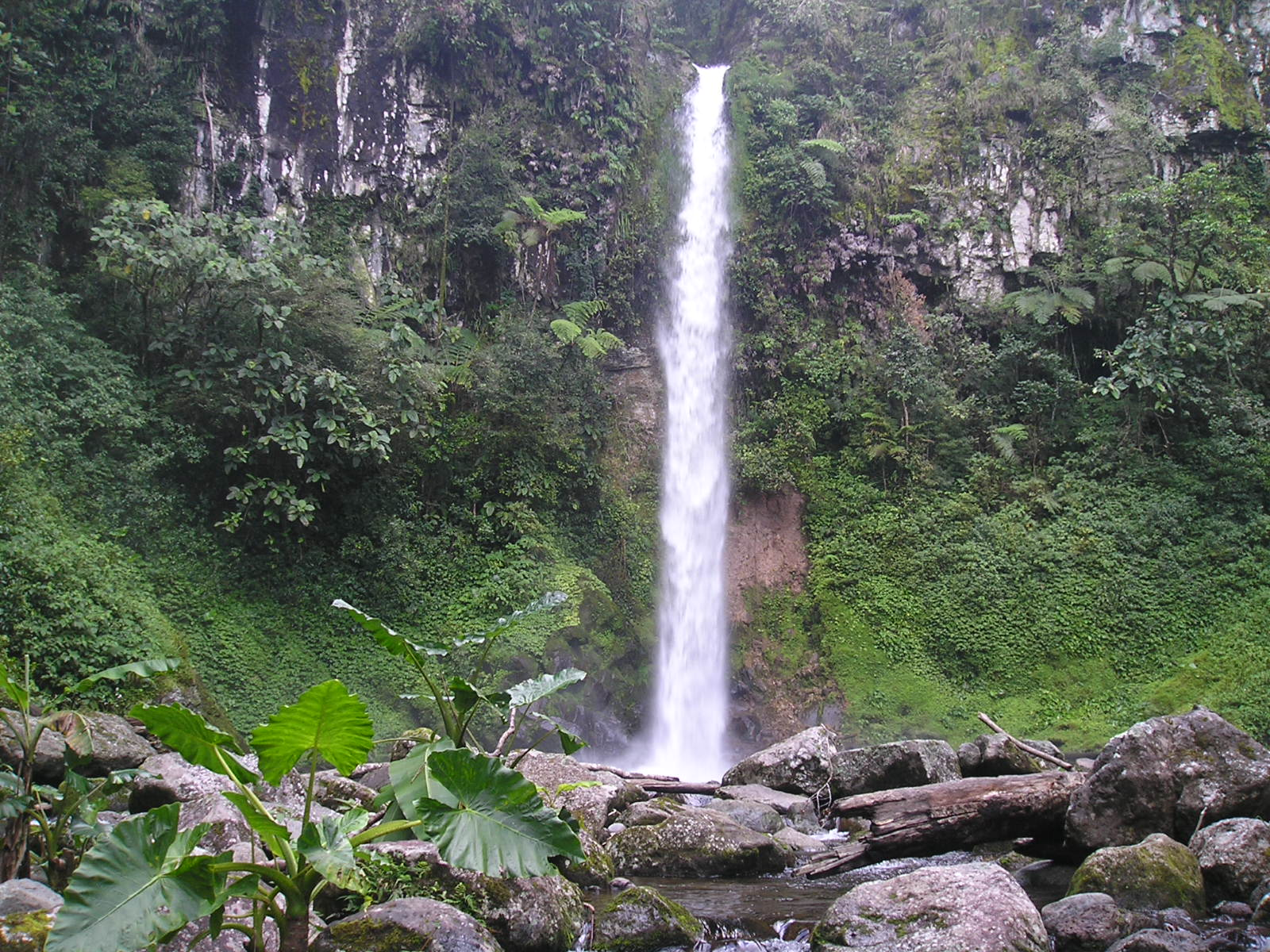
Kalatungan Falls

The range is the origin of the headwaters of the tributaries of the major river systems in Bukidnon—Pulangi River, Cagayan River, and Maradugao River, Sawaga River. Among these rivers are the Bangahan River in the southwest, Ticalaan River in the northwest, Lantay River in the south, and Manupali River in the north.

Also found in the vicinity of the mountain range are streams that flow through waterfalls, cascades and rapids. Wetlands and marshes, although not significant in area, are also found within the range. The mountain range exhibits a radial drainage pattern.

== Cultural and biological diversity ==
Indigenous Manobo and Talaandig people live in the mountain range and consider it part of their ancestral lands. They consider the forest sacred and have taken care of it for centuries.

The mountain range is a key biodiversity area, home to at least 129 animal species and 342 plant species. A number of endangered or vulnerable species are found on the mountain range, such as the Philippine eagle, Philippine hawk eagle, flying fox, Philippine warty pig, and Philippine deer. The Mindanao pygmy fruit bat is also found on the range. Endemic tree species that dominate the area are the katmon, white lauan, red lauan, bagtikan, and bikal-boboi, as well as the threatened almasiga.

Indigenous communities take part in conservation efforts in the area.

== See also ==
- List of natural parks of the Philippines
- List of protected areas of the Philippines
