= Maramag River =

River in Bukidnon, Philippines

- Location within Mindanao mainland Location within Philippines

Location
- Country: Philippines
- Region: Northern Mindanao
- Province: Bukidnon
- Municipality: Maramag

Physical characteristics
- Mouth: Pulangi River; Pulangi Lake
  - coordinates: 7°42′09″N 125°02′02″E

Basin features
- Progression: Maramag–Pulangi–Mindanao

The Maramag River is located in the province of Bukidnon in the Northern Mindanao region of the Mindanao island group, in the southern Philippines.

The river flows near the town of Maramag. The Maramag River is a tributary of Pulangi Lake and the Pulangi River.

A 2.04MW hydropower plant is run by the Maramag Mini-Hydro Power Corporation.

== See also ==
- Province of Bukidnon topics
