= Malitubog River =

River in Mindanao, Philippines

- Location within Mindanao mainland Location within Philippines

Location
- Country: Philippines

Physical characteristics
- Source: Wao, Lanao del Sur; Mount Piapayungan
- Mouth: Maradugao River
  - coordinates: 7°11′17″N 124°42′35″E

Basin features
- Progression: Malitubog–Maradugao–Pulangi–Mindanao

The Malitubog River is one of the major tributaries of the Maradugao River in Mindanao, Philippines. The Malitubog–Maridagao River Irrigation System supports about 5,500 hectares of rice fields within the Autonomous Region in Muslim Mindanao. The Municipality of Alamada's easternmost boundary is ends in the left bank of the river.
