= Kalawaig River =

River in Mindanao, Philippines

- Kalawaig River mouth Kalawaig River (Philippines)

Location
- Country: Philippines

Physical characteristics
- Mouth: Cagayan River
  - coordinates: 8°18′06″N 124°36′05″E

Basin features
- Progression: Kalawaig–Cagayan

The Kalawaig River is a river in Mindanao, Philippines. It is a tributary of the Cagayan River. Its waters are considered as Class A by the Department of Environment and Natural Resources meaning it needs to be treated to meet the National Standards for Drinking Water.
