= Dampilasan River =

River in Bukidnon, Philippines

Dampilasan River Dampilasan Creek
- Location within Mindanao mainland Location within Philippines

Location
- Country: Philippines
- Region: Northern Mindanao
- Province: Bukidnon

Physical characteristics
- Mouth: Pulangi River
  - coordinates: 8°21′43″N 125°14′19″E

The Dampilasan River or Dampilasan Creek is a river in the province of Bukidnon, Philippines. It is located in the municipality of Impasugong. It is a tributary of the Pulangi River.
