= Manupali River =

- Location within Mindanao mainland Location within Philippines

Location
- Country: Philippines
- Region: Northern Mindanao
- Province: Bukidnon

Physical characteristics
- Mouth
  - location: Pulangi River
  - coordinates: 7°58′46″N 125°08′47″E

Basin features
- Progression: Manupali–Pulangi–Mindanao

The Manupali River is a river in central Bukidnon, on the Philippine island of Mindanao. It is one of the major tributaries of the Pulangi River that drains into the Rio Grande de Mindanao. Among its tributaries are Balangbangan Creek and the Maagnao and Tandacol Rivers.
