= Tagite River =

River in Mindanao, Philippines

Location
- Country: Philippines

Physical characteristics
- Mouth: Cagayan River

Basin features
- Progression: Tagite–Mindanao

The Tagite River is a river in Mindanao, Philippines. It is one of the five major river systems or tributaries that feed the Cagayan River.
