= Arakan River =

River in Cotabato, Philippines

- Arakan River mouth Arakan River (Philippines)

Location
- Country: Philippines
- Region: Soccsksargen
- Province: Cotabato
- Municipality: Arakan

Physical characteristics
- Mouth: Pulangi River
  - coordinates: 7°21′25″N 124°55′54″E

The Arakan River is a river located in the municipality of Arakan in Cotabato province in the Philippines. It is one of the tributaries of the Pulangi River.
