= Maramag =

Municipality in Bukidnon, Philippines

- Municipality
- Municipality of Maramag
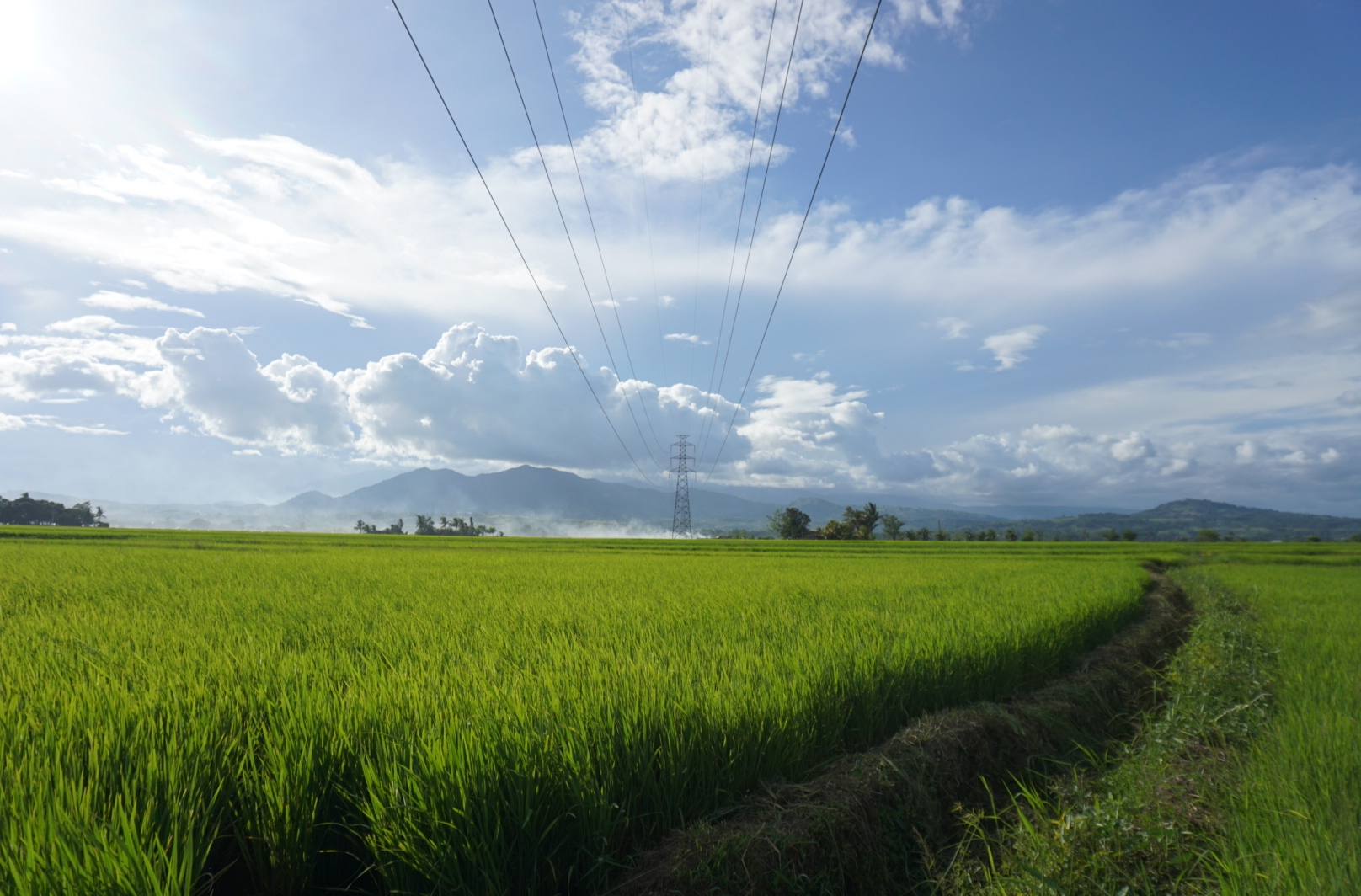
- Kalatungan Mountains as seen from Maramag

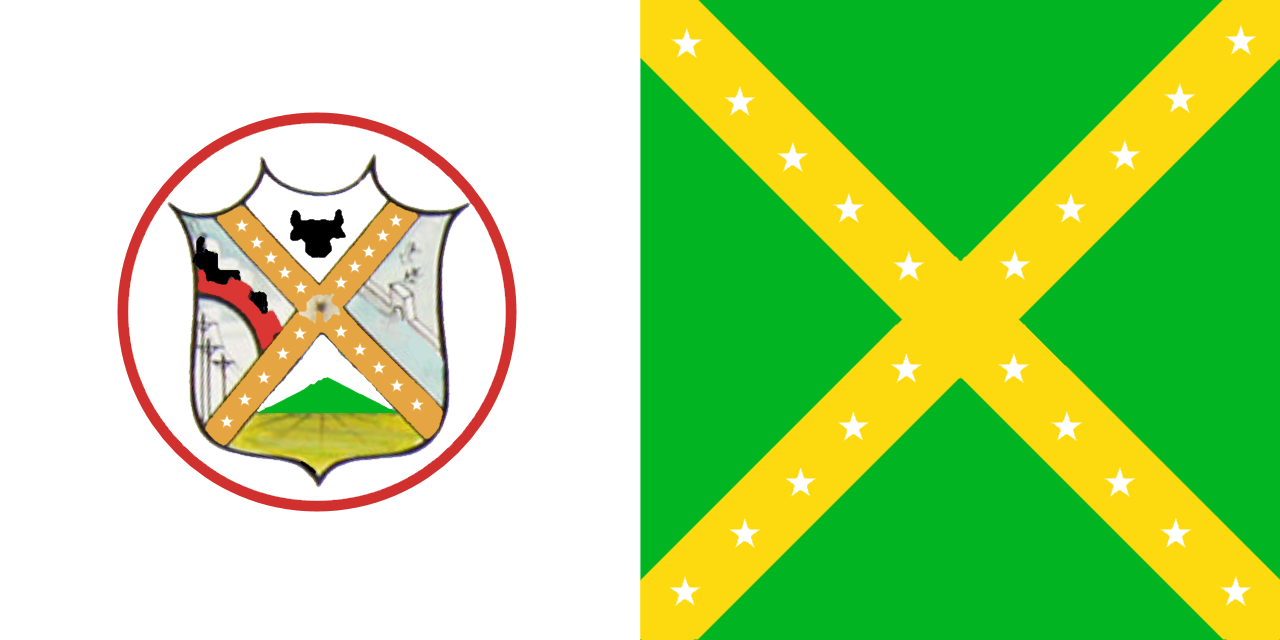
- Flag Seal
- Nickname: The Place for Secured Investment
- Motto(s): Maramag for all, All for Maramag!
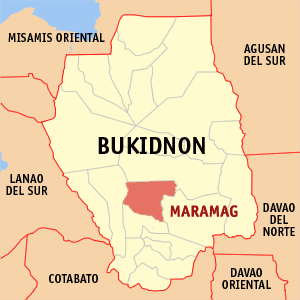
- Map of Bukidnon with Maramag highlighted
- Interactive map of Maramag
- Location within the Philippines
- Coordinates: 7°45′47″N 125°00′18″E
- Country: Philippines
- Region: Northern Mindanao
- Province: Bukidnon
- District: 3rd district
- Founded: July 1, 1956
- Barangays: 20 (see Barangays)

Government
  - Type: Sangguniang Bayan
  - Mayor: Jose Joel P. Doromal
  - Vice Mayor: Maribeth Estrella-Lopez
  - Representative: Audrey Zubiri
  - Municipal Council: Members: Maribeth E. Lopez; Nestor G. Paulican; Joselyn L. Puerin; Abundio U. Gaitera; Roy Y. Cabalquinto; Ruben R. Villapaz; Esterlla C. Cuadrasal; Bernard Lawrence L. Zubiri
  - Electorate: 65,837 voters (2025)

Area
  - Total: 447.26 km^{2} (172.69 sq mi)
- Elevation: 304 m (997 ft)
- Highest elevation: 574 m (1,883 ft)
- Lowest elevation: 183 m (600 ft)

Population (2024 census)
  - Total: 109,864
  - Density: 245.64/km^{2} (636.20/sq mi)
  - Households: 25,571

Economy
  - Income class: 1st municipal income class
  - Poverty incidence: 20.42% (2023)
  - Revenue: ₱ 574.6 million (2024)
  - Assets: ₱ 1,423 million (2024)
  - Expenditure: ₱ 573.7 million (2024)
  - Liabilities: ₱ 400.6 million (2024)

Service provider
  - Electricity: First Bukidnon Electric Cooperative (FIBECO)
- Time zone: UTC+8 (PST)
- ZIP code: 8714
- PSGC: 1001315000
- IDD : area code: +63 (0)88
- Native languages: Western Bukidnon Manobo; Binukid; Cebuano; Ata Manobo; Tagalog
- Website: maramag.gov.ph

Maramag, officially the Municipality of Maramag (Cebuano: Lungsod sa Maramag; Tagalog: Bayan ng Maramag), is a municipality in the province of Bukidnon, Philippines. According to the 2024 census, it has a population of 109,864 people.

== History ==
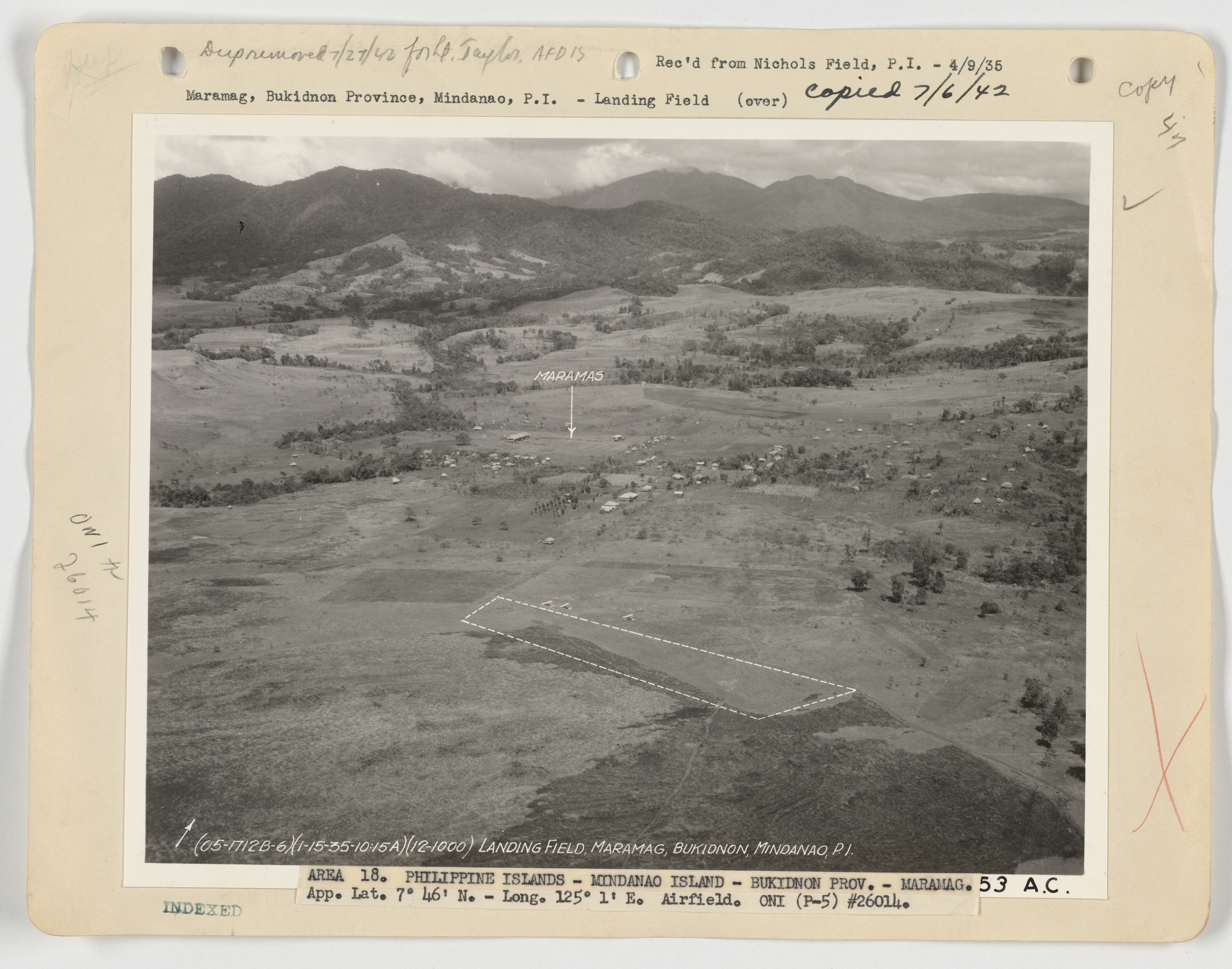
Aerial view of Maramag, 1935

Maramag from “Ag Ramag”, a contracted Manobo term for “Ag Ramag Ki Dini”, which as freely translated, means “Let us eat our breakfast here.” The story as officially published by the late Prescioso Velez Abellanosa Sr. (a former municipal mayor) goes that the Manobos were constantly in conflict with the Maranaos for supremacy over the locality. Each time they set out for the battle they would stop on the bank of Pulangi River where flat stones that serve as their tables abound the area. Atop of these, they would draw their plans and eat their breakfast. This habit becomes their practice that even in times of peace and as a sign of good faith, these “Lumads”, the natives or early settlers invite others who happen to pass by to partake meals with them. Maramag then was a picnic ground were one can rest and take his meal as a short respite either from travel, trekking, hunting and trapping or from battle.

Through the years, even Christians (referred to as "Dumagats", literally 'seaborne/coming from beyond the sea') started to come and settle near the place. They too would stop and eat their meals on these big flat stones during hunting trips or as they travel on foot from one valley to another. As more and more Christian settlers occupied the surrounding places, Ag Ramag became more commonly called as Maramag – a homonym or a contraction of the original Manobo term “Ag Ramag”.

The political history of the municipality traces back in 1916 when the late Deputy Governor Cenon R. Paulican positively declared that people from different parts of the country began settling in the area. Years later, the people informally elected a leader among them as the incipient local government started to take form. They called their leaders “Captain”. These leaders normally remained in office for as long as their political abilities and faithfulness to duty would allow; Monarchial in so many ways although an election process is in place. This system prevailed up to the Second World War.

In 1945, the first appointed Mayor was put in place to head the municipal government followed by two others. The first election for the position of the Municipal Mayor was held in 1951. The election for the members of the Barrio Council was held in 1955. From then on, ten other Municipal Mayors were either appointed or elected in the past 56 years up to the present.

Maramag was formally created as a municipality through Executive Order No. 272 issued by then President Carlos P. Garcia on July 1, 1956. The Poblacion of Maramag was formerly located in Barangay Base Camp, three kilometers away from the present Poblacion. After World War II and upon the completion of the Sayre Highway, people started to move along the highway in a linear then nodal fashion and later concentrically forming the Poblacion today, composing Barangay North and South Poblacions.

The municipal boundaries between Maramag, Pangantucan and Kibawe were established in 1935 by the then deputy Governor Cenon Paulican. Then, Maramag, with the organization of the former barangays Don Carlos and Quezon into regular municipalities, was reduced to its present area of about 58,198.98 hectares. As reported too, in the late sixties, a Memorandum of Agreement between Maramag and Valencia, Bukidnon was forged as to their common boundaries. Purportedly, the Lumbo Creek, as it flows to the Pulangi River defines the demarcation between the two municipalities.

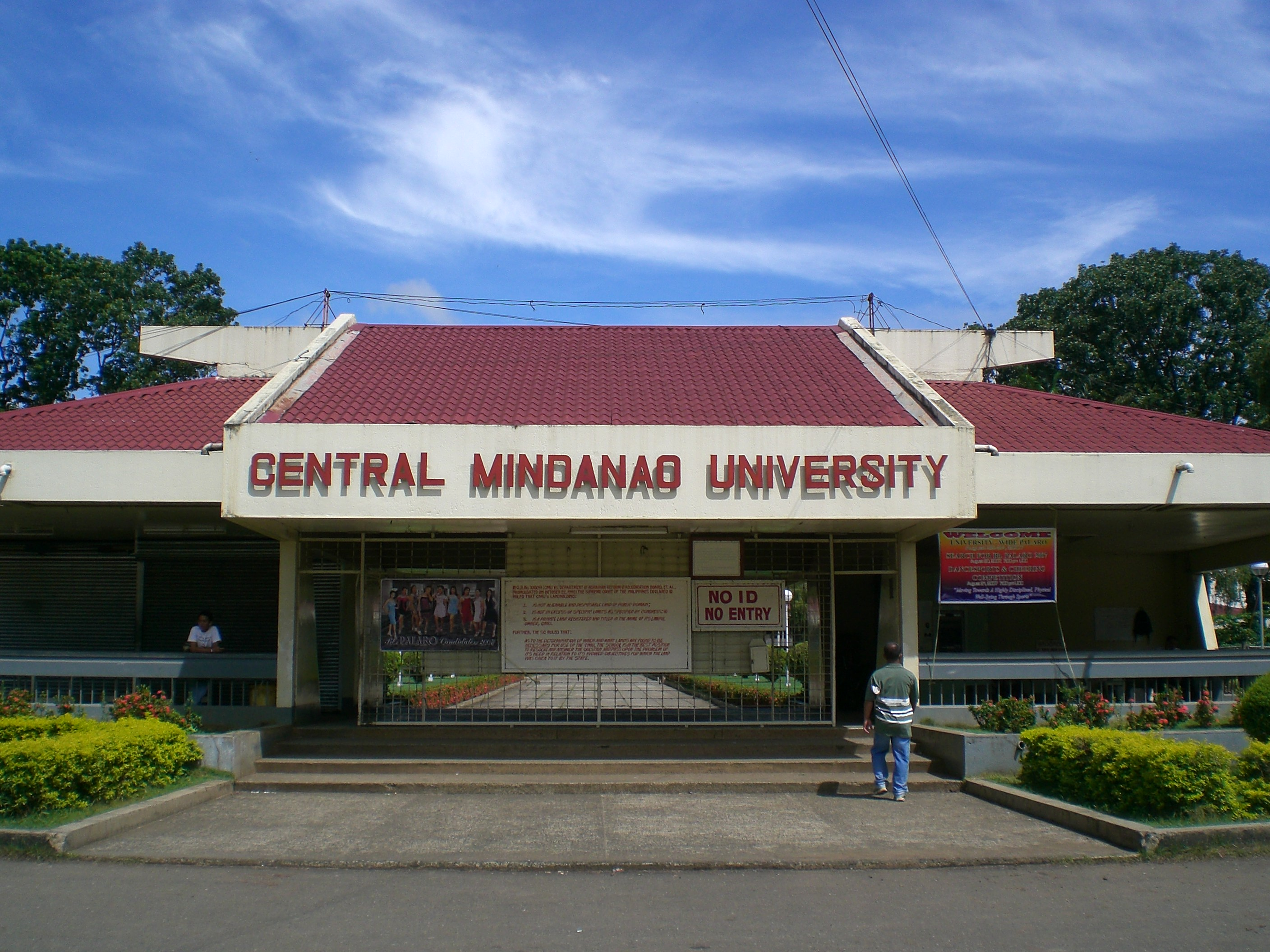
Central Mindanao University (CMU) at Musuan, Maramag, Bukidnon

The current seat of the government of Maramag consists of two barangays: the North and South Poblacion. When the Central Mindanao University (CMU) is transferred to Musuan, Dologon, Maramag, Bukidnon from Managok, Malaybalay, Bukidnon, the municipality became the host of the premier agricultural school in Mindanao.

The municipality likewise served as the nodal point of the major national roads of the province to the different places of Mindanao namely: the Bukidnon–Wao (Lanao del Sur) road the Bukidnon – North Cotobato Road and the Bukidnon – Cagayan de Oro Road.

Maramag boasts its agricultural importance to the development of the province. It has the Crystal Sugar Corporation with a rated capacity of 6,000 tons per day. As of 1999, the total area planted to sugarcane was 20,500 hectares, which ranked as the number one crop. Corn ranks second with 10,800 hectares planted and rice accounts for the third major crop in the municipality with the irrigated areas reaching 4,900 hectares.

The National Power Corporation (NAPOCOR) Pulangi IV Hydroelectric Plant with a rated capacity of 255 megawatts is found in Maramag. The Power Plant contributed the Mindanao Grid.

In terms of environment, the municipality plays a vital role in the protection of the Bukidnon Watershed. Thirty percent of the land, approximately 17,340 hectares, of Maramag has been designated as forest land. These include the protected forest (10.45%), production forest (85.85%) and buffer zones (3.7%). The forest area categorized under the NIPAS is the 1,939.62 hectares within the confines of Mt. Kalatungan Range, the third highest mountain of the country.

Maramag also has a number of springs, which had contributed to its esteemed title, "The Land of Springs". Because of its prominence within the municipality, it attracted many tourists from near and afar to feel and indulge upon the cold and crystalline waters.

== Geography ==
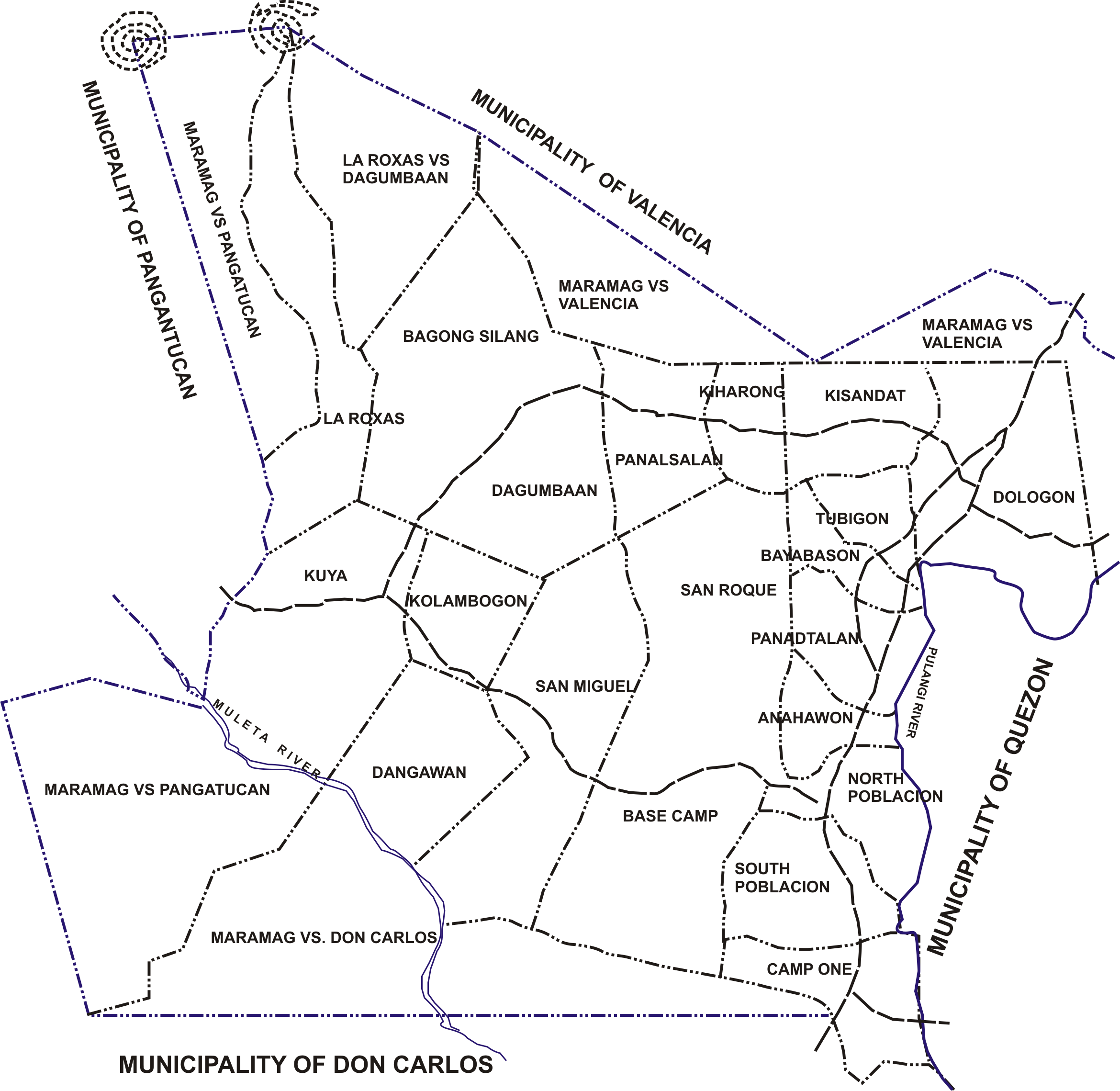
Political map of Maramag, showing its 20 barangays

Maramag, a landlocked municipality of Bukidnon, is approximately 158 kilometres (98 mi) southeast of Cagayan de Oro, around 50 kilometres (31 mi) south of Malaybalay City, 152 kilometres (94 mi) from Davao City and 281 kilometres (175 mi) from General Santos.

It is bounded on the north and north-eastern by the municipality of Valencia; on the east by the municipality of Quezon; on the south by the municipality of Don Carlos; and on the west by the municipality of Pangantucan, all within the Province of Bukidnon. It is located within the geographic coordinates of 7°41’, to 7°58’ North latitude and 124°47’ to 125°14’ East longitude.

Maramag covers a total land area of 44,726 hectares (110,520 acres) and politically divided into 20 barangays. The largest barangay is Kuya.

=== Barangays ===
Maramag is politically subdivided into 20 barangays. Each barangay consists of puroks while some have sitios.

Five barangays are categorized as urban: Base Camp, Dagumba-an, Dologon, North and South Poblacions; and fifteen as rural.

PSGC	Barangay	Population			±% p.a.	
		2024		2010		
101315001	Anahawon	2.7%	3,016	2,350	▴	1.74%
101315002	Base Camp	6.9%	7,569	6,905	▴	0.64%
101315003	Bayabason (Spring)	2.5%	2,737	2,370	▴	1.00%
101315004	Camp I	4.4%	4,852	4,416	▴	0.65%
101315005	Colambugon	1.7%	1,916	1,761	▴	0.58%
101315006	Dagumba‑an	7.0%	7,638	7,134	▴	0.47%
101315007	Danggawan	1.5%	1,680	1,587	▴	0.39%
101315008	Dologon	12.8%	14,093	11,747	▴	1.27%
101315009	Kisanday	2.4%	2,599	2,620	▾	−0.06%
101315010	Kuya	4.4%	4,819	4,294	▴	0.80%
101315011	La Roxas	2.2%	2,430	2,191	▴	0.72%
101315012	Panadtalan	4.3%	4,774	3,983	▴	1.26%
101315013	Panalsalan	2.1%	2,344	2,194	▴	0.46%
101315014	North Poblacion	13.5%	14,799	12,352	▴	1.26%
101315015	South Poblacion	11.1%	12,165	11,408	▴	0.45%
101315016	San Miguel	5.9%	6,518	5,942	▴	0.64%
101315017	San Roque	2.8%	3,126	2,952	▴	0.40%
101315018	Tubigon	2.0%	2,201	1,902	▴	1.01%
101315019	Bagongsilang	1.0%	1,045	1,041	▴	0.03%
101315020	Kiharong	1.6%	1,768	1,752	▴	0.06%
	Total		109,864	90,901	▴	1.32%

=== Topography ===
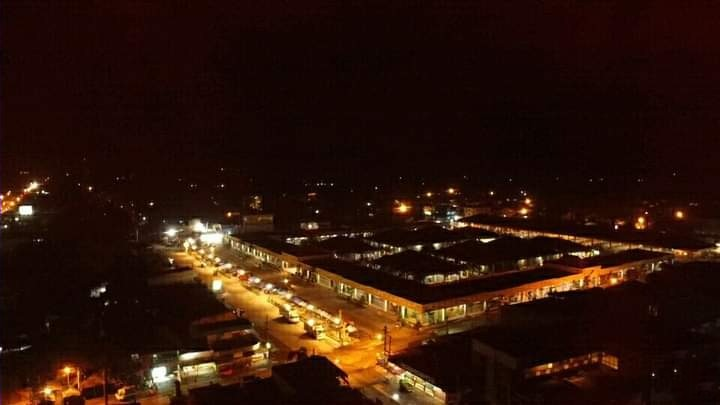
Aerial view of Maramag at night

Maramag is bounded in the North-East by mountain ranges of Mount Kilakron and Mount Kalatungan. Among its important landmarks are the Adtuyon Plateau and the Musuan Peak, at the base of which lies the Central Mindanao University (CMU), a state university at Musuan, Barangay Dologon.

The municipality is well distributed in terms of slope gradients. The eastern and central sections of Maramag except in some patches are characteristically flat but undulated towards the northern and western boundaries of the area.

Areas having slopes of 0–18 percent occupies almost half (48.84%) of the entire municipality with the 0-3% slope category accounting for 26.47 percent. Another slope category with considerable area is the 8-18% occupying around 9,014.76 hectares and comprising 17.27 percent of the total land area. The largest area in Maramag in terms of the slope grouping is the 18-30%, which comprised 27.39 percent of the land area or an equivalent area of 14,297.30 hectares. The very steep hills and mountains (50% and above in slope) in Maramag occupy only 6,566.63 or 12.58% of the total land area. These areas are located mostly in the western and northern boundaries of Maramag.

=== Water bodies ===
Bodies of water abound the area, the Baguic-ican River in the east, flowing downstream as tributary of Muleta River that drains in the South to Don Carlos; and the Maramag River whose tributaries upstream originates from the central portion of the municipality, which flows further towards the Pulangi River. Another tributary to Pulangi River that flows within the area are the Kibalagon Creek and the Kulaman River, both found in the North East.

Only Pulangi Watershed is identified to have an influence on the availability of water resources in Maramag.

=== Climate ===
Climate data for Maramag, Bukidnon
Month	Jan	Feb	Mar	Apr	May	Jun	Jul	Aug	Sep	Oct	Nov	Dec	Year
Mean daily maximum °C (°F)	29 (84)	29 (84)	30 (86)	31 (88)	30 (86)	29 (84)	29 (84)	29 (84)	30 (86)	29 (84)	29 (84)	29 (84)	29 (85)
Mean daily minimum °C (°F)	20 (68)	20 (68)	20 (68)	21 (70)	22 (72)	23 (73)	22 (72)	22 (72)	22 (72)	22 (72)	22 (72)	21 (70)	21 (71)
Average precipitation mm (inches)	44 (1.7)	27 (1.1)	32 (1.3)	35 (1.4)	76 (3.0)	117 (4.6)	108 (4.3)	108 (4.3)	94 (3.7)	100 (3.9)	76 (3.0)	46 (1.8)	863 (34.1)
Average rainy days	10.3	8.1	8.5	9.6	21.0	24.9	25.0	24.2	22.5	23.4	17.7	11.4	206.6
Source: Meteoblue (modeled/calculated data, not measured locally)

== Demographics ==
Population census of Maramag
Year	Pop.	±% p.a.
1918	5,854	—
1939	3,459	−2.47%
1948	4,064	+1.81%
1960	32,654	+18.96%
1970	21,839	−3.94%
1975	29,901	+6.50%
1980	36,734	+4.20%
1990	55,394	+4.19%
1995	62,673	+2.34%
2000	75,233	+3.99%
2007	85,647	+1.80%
2010	90,901	+2.19%
2015	102,089	+2.24%
2020	108,293	+1.25%
2024	109,864	+0.35%
Source: Philippine Statistics Authority

In the 2024 census, the population of Maramag was 109,864 people, with a density of 250 inhabitants per square kilometre or 650 inhabitants per square mile.

=== Ethnicity ===
The population in the municipality is a mixture of different tribal origins. We can observe people speaking in different dialects/languages which are an implication of being foreign or in migrant to the locality.

Based from historical accounts, the original inhabitants of Maramag came from the blood of Manobos and Maranaos. Through the years, Christians or Dumagats started to come and settle in the area. Among them, Cebuano tongue predominated the place, while other majority groups find their living in all the corners of Maramag, although Lumads can still be found.

=== Languages and dialects ===
As shown in the Calendar Year 2000 Census of Population, the inhabitants of Maramag is composed of 77 carried ethnic groups. Cebuano is the dominant group among these carried ethnic groups. Other ethnic groups of higher headcount include Boholano, Hiligaynon/Ilonggo, Bukidnon, Ilocano and Tagalog.

== Economy ==
Poverty incidence of Maramag (%)

Source: Philippine Statistics Authority

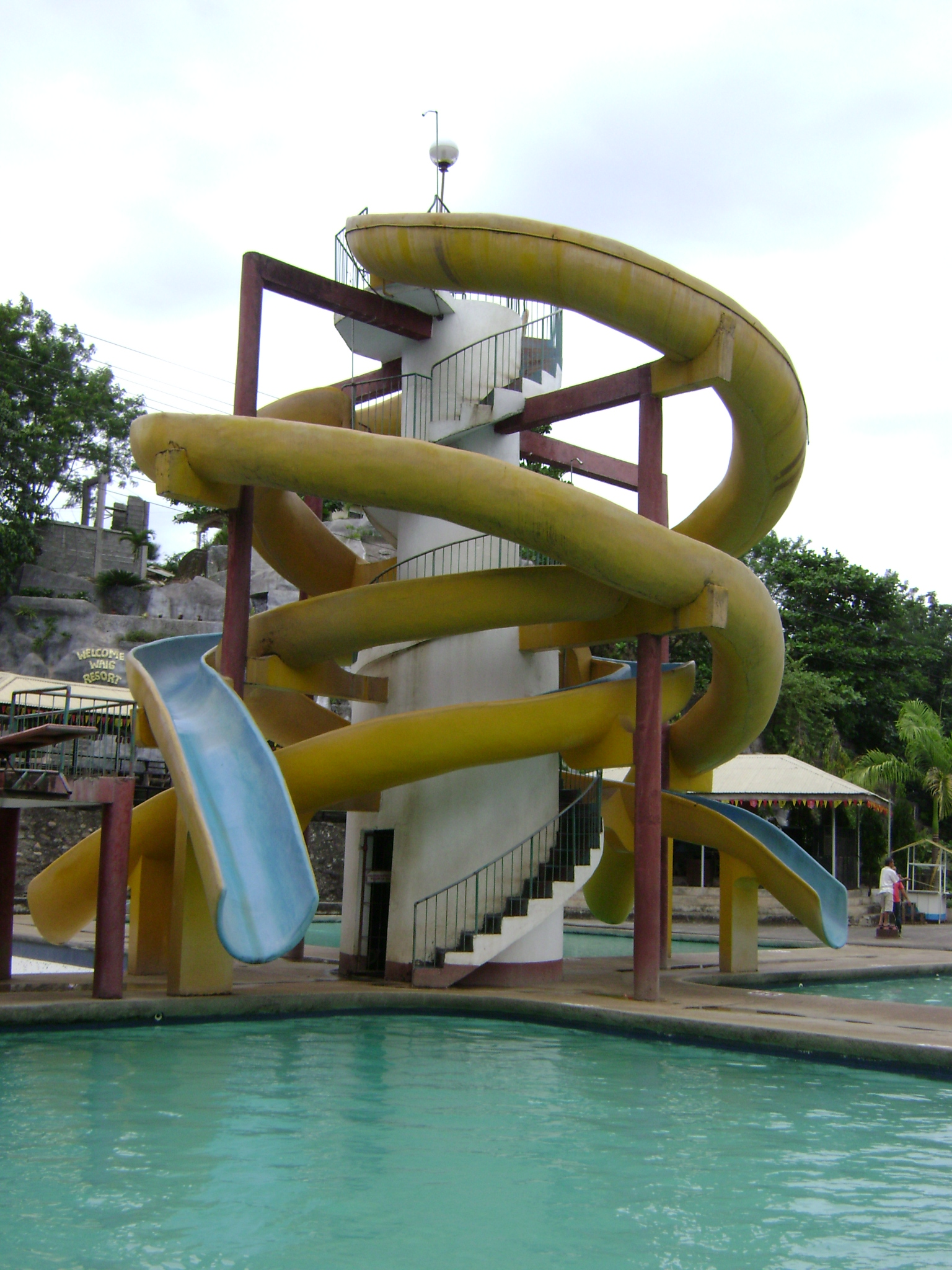
Waig Crystal Spring Resort

Maramag is home to inland aqua-culture hatcheries and Techno Demo Farm where agricultural technology is developed. The Dole Banana Plantation has a total area of 800 hectares. The plantation contributes to the supply of bananas exportation of the known DOLE Company.

Industries include mulberry production, mineral and purified drinking water production, and sugar processing.

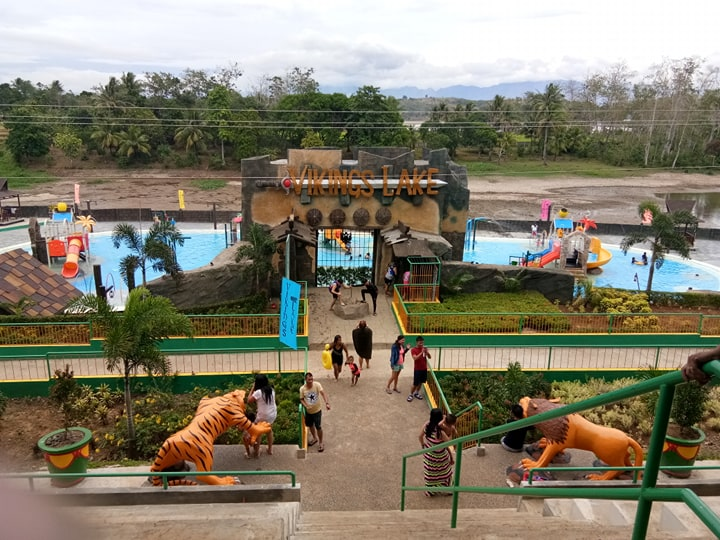
RR Family Spring Resort

Electric power is generated at the Pulangi IV Hydro Electric Plant in Barangay Camp 1. With rated capacity of 255 megawatts, the power plant supplies power to various provinces of Mindanao.

The Maramag Public Wet Market was named as the cleanest wet market in the country by numerous blogging award-giving bodies.
