= Impasugong =

Municipality in Bukidnon, Philippines

- Municipality
- Municipality of Impasugong
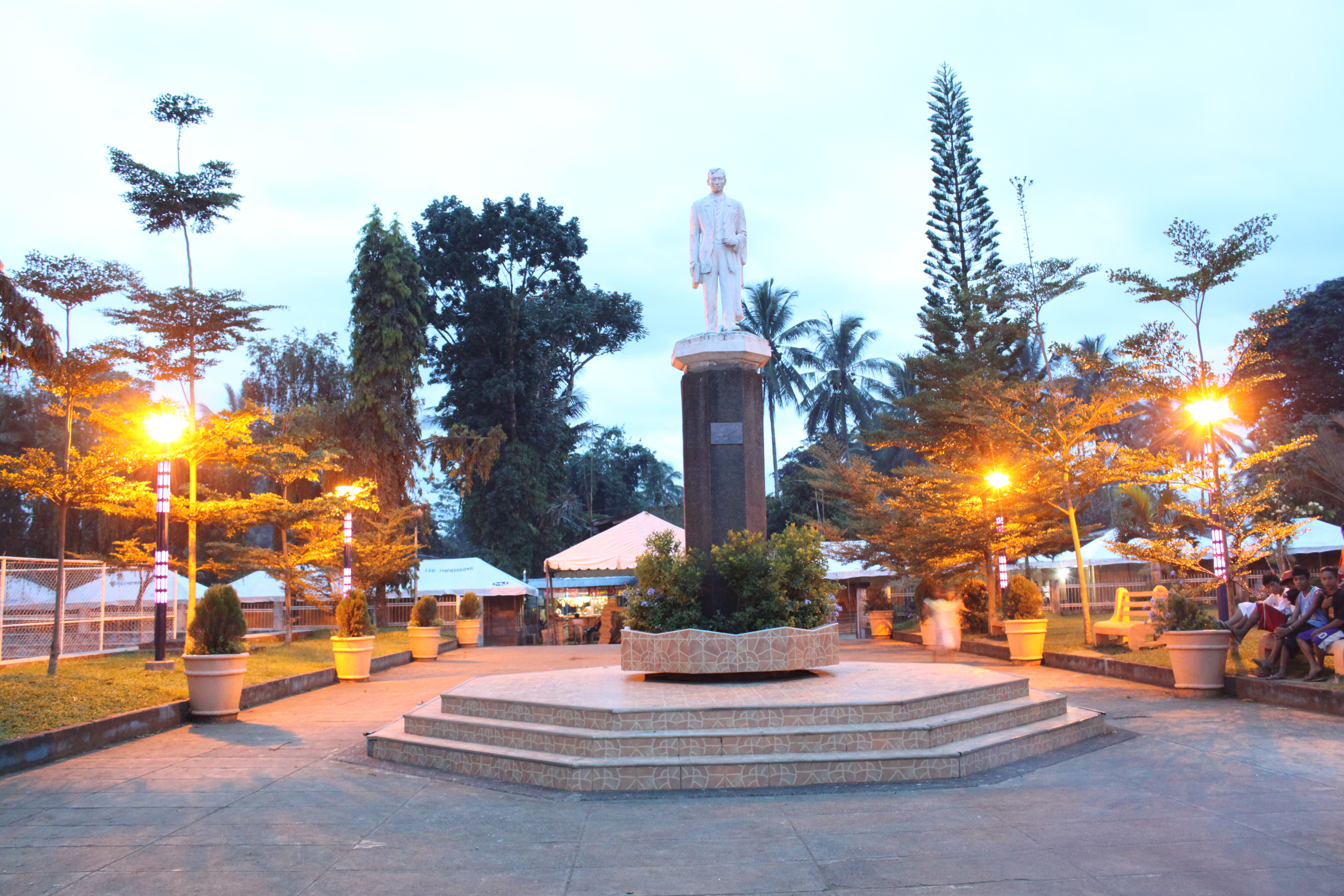
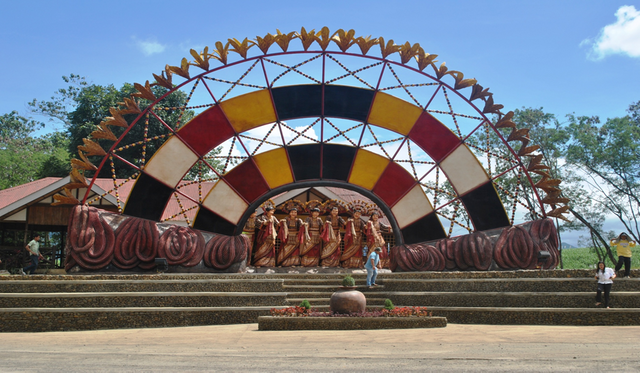
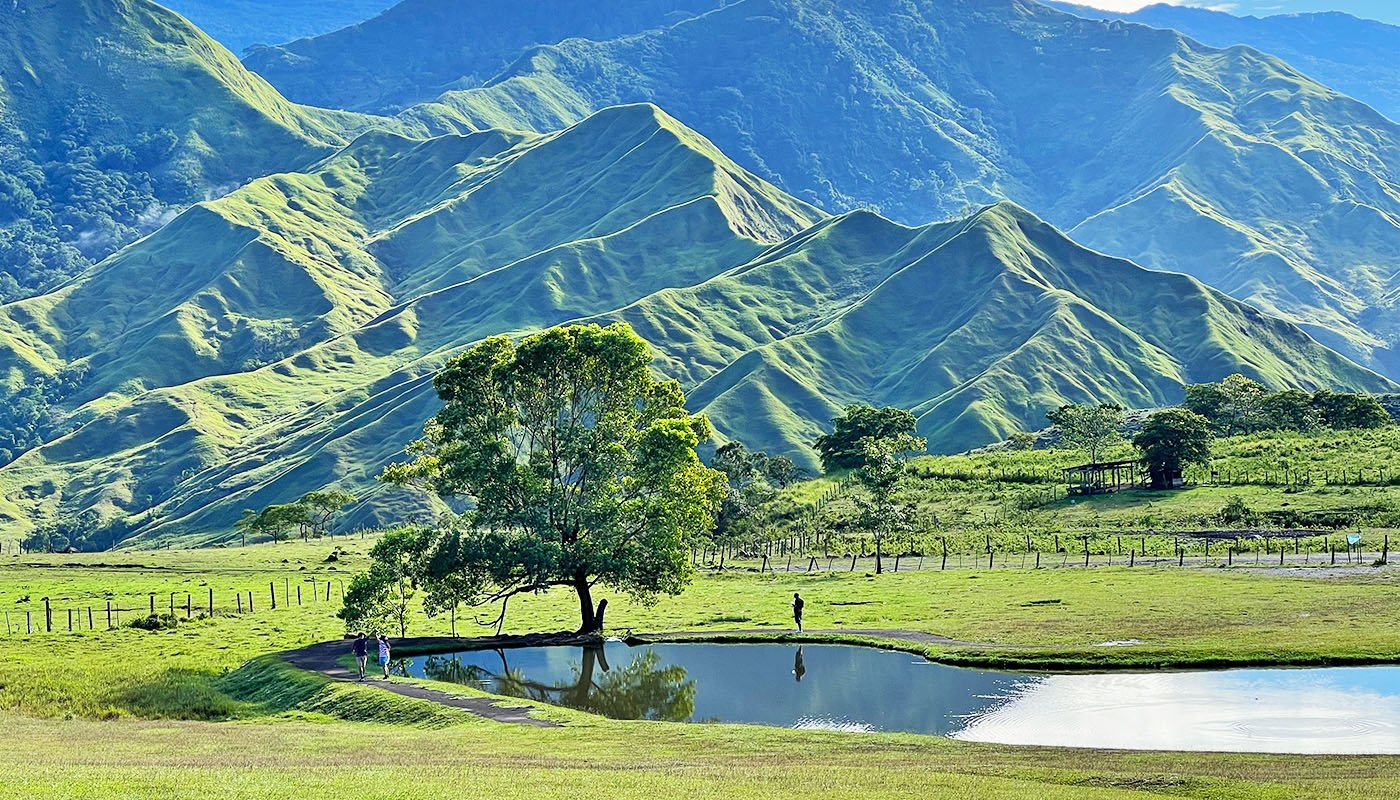
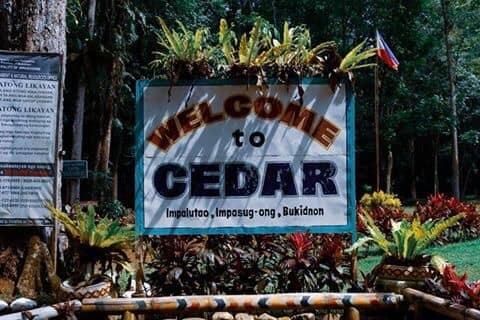
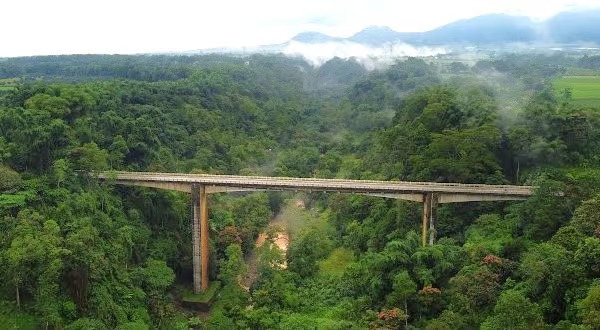
- Impasug-ong Plaza Panika Monument Communal Ranch CEDAR Atugan Bridge

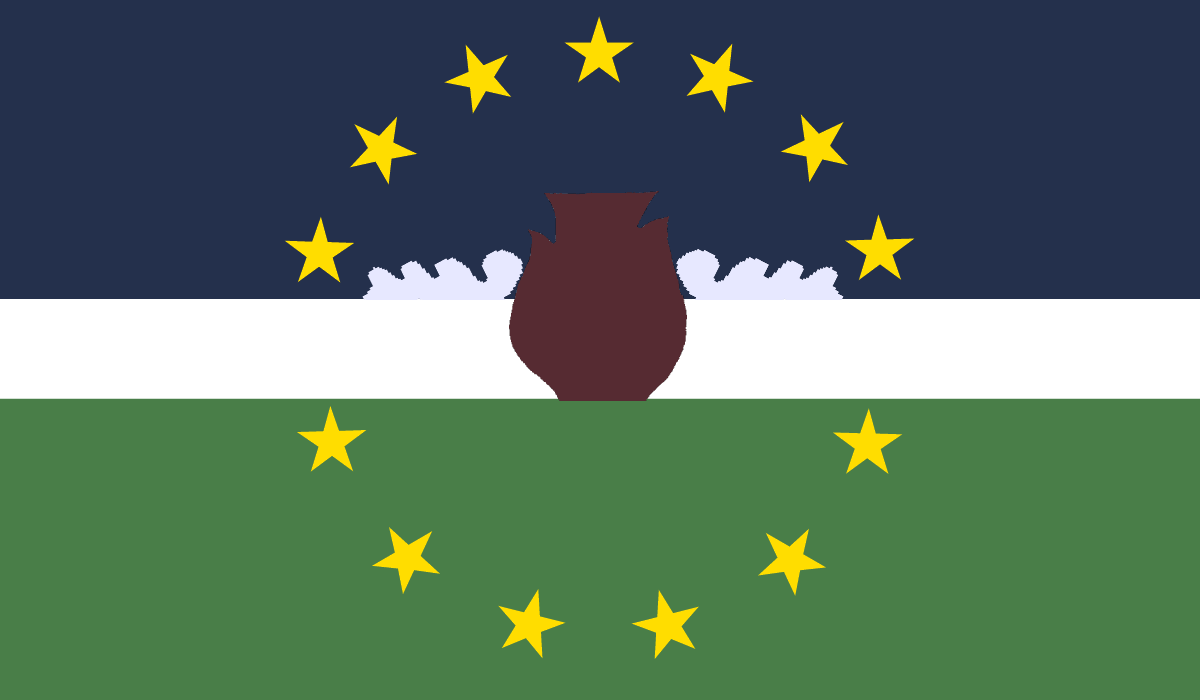
- Flag Seal
- Nicknames: Rodeo Capital of Southern Philippines; Home of the Finest Cowboys; The New Zealand of Mindanao
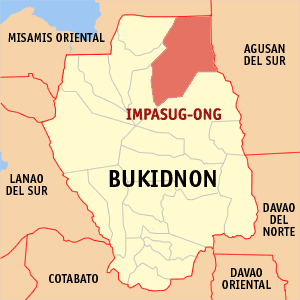
- Map of Bukidnon with Impasugong highlighted
- Interactive map of Impasugong
- Location within the Philippines
- Coordinates: 8°18′10″N 125°00′05″E
- Country: Philippines
- Region: Northern Mindanao
- Province: Bukidnon
- District: 2nd district
- Founded: June 16, 1950
- Barangays: 13 (see Barangays)

Government
  - Type: Sangguniang Bayan
  - Mayor: Anthony "Cheche" A. Uy
  - Vice Mayor: Johnny Chaves
  - Representative: Jonathan Keith T. Flores
  - Municipal Council: Members: Johnny A. Chavez; Jonathan C. Olana; Eutropio S. Jamilo; Xenia Jane O. Echeminada; Jesse Jose O. Uy; Meriel A. Almeda; Maxuel D. Antivo; Jetaime A. Okinlay-Gumban
  - Electorate: 36,202 voters (2025)

Area
  - Total: 1,051.17 km^{2} (405.86 sq mi)
- Elevation: 629 m (2,064 ft)
- Highest elevation: 1,094 m (3,589 ft)
- Lowest elevation: 333 m (1,093 ft)

Population (2024 census)
  - Total: 55,901
  - Density: 53.180/km^{2} (137.74/sq mi)
  - Households: 11,843

Economy
  - Income class: 1st municipal income class
  - Poverty incidence: 33.16% (2023)
  - Revenue: ₱ 504.3 million (2024)
  - Assets: ₱ 1,339 million (2024)
  - Expenditure: ₱ 376.4 million (2024)
  - Liabilities: ₱ 85.47 million (2024)

Service provider
  - Electricity: Bukidnon 2 Electric Cooperative (BUSECO)
- Time zone: UTC+8 (PST)
- ZIP code: 8702
- PSGC: 1001305000
- IDD : area code: +63 (0)88
- Native languages: Binukid; Cebuano; Ata Manobo; Tagalog
- Website: www.impasugongbuk.gov.ph

Impasugong, officially the Municipality of Impasugong (Binukid and Higaonon: Bánuwa ta Impasug-ung; Cebuano: Lungsod sa Impasugong; Tagalog: Bayan ng Impasugong), is a municipality in the province of Bukidnon, Philippines. According to the 2024 census, it has a population of 55,901 people.

It is also spelled Impasug-ong.

Impasug-ong also has a tree park, which is a 15-minute drive from the centre. The town's communal ranch which has a 642-hectare land area is the only communal ranch solely owned by the government throughout the Philippines.

== Geography ==
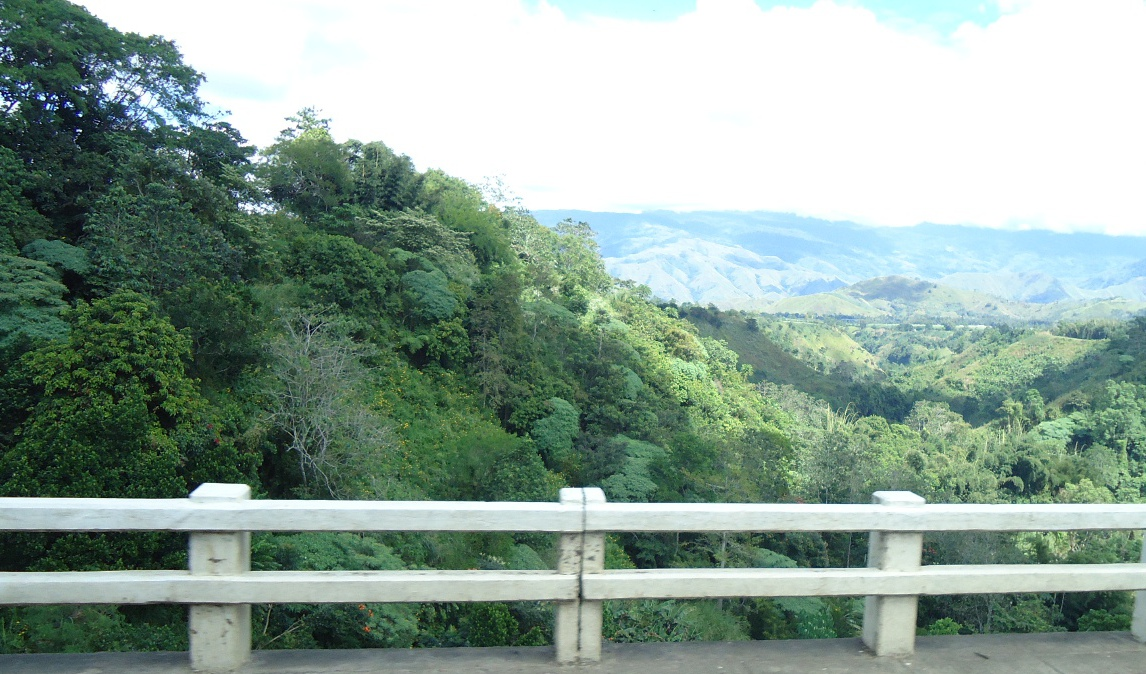
The Atugan Canyon, seen from the Atugan New Bridge along the Sayre Highway

Impasugong is strategically located in the north-eastern part of the Province of Bukidnon. It is approximately 75 kilometres (47 mi) from Cagayan de Oro City, a good 1½-hour drive and it is half an hour away from Malaybalay City, the capital of the province.

With a total number of 13 barangays, it is characterized by mountains, deep canyons and gorges. The terrain is predominantly rugged with a significant slope of 18% and above covering 72% of the land area and distributed throughout the municipality.

=== Barangays ===
Impasugong is politically subdivided into 13 barangays. Each barangay consists of puroks while some have sitios.

PSGC	Barangay	Population			±% p.a.	
		2024		2010		
101305001	Bontongon	1.4%	800	750	▴	0.44%
101305002	Bulonay	2.7%	1,525	1,344	▴	0.87%
101305003	Capitan Bayong	5.6%	3,122	2,788	▴	0.78%
101305004	Cawayan	3.7%	2,080	1,761	▴	1.15%
101305005	Dumalaguing	5.0%	2,800	2,391	▴	1.09%
101305006	Guihean	3.8%	2,128	1,837	▴	1.02%
101305007	Hagpa	5.1%	2,859	2,573	▴	0.73%
101305008	Impalutao	11.1%	6,183	6,078	▴	0.12%
101305010	Kalabugao	9.1%	5,084	4,882	▴	0.28%
101305011	Kibenton	7.6%	4,242	3,670	▴	1.00%
101305012	La Fortuna	7.8%	4,360	4,081	▴	0.46%
101305013	Poblacion	20.2%	11,279	10,116	▴	0.75%
101305015	Sayawan	2.5%	1,397	1,316	▴	0.41%
	Total		55,901	43,587	▴	1.73%

According to family accounts passed down through generations, Salvador Manhura—the respected Capitan del Barrio in whose honor the barangay was named in 1969—earned his widely known moniker "Bayong" due to his critical and perilous role during the Japanese occupation of World War II.

During the war, Salvador Manhura acted as the primary liaison and direct point of contact between the occupying Japanese forces and the local population. In this high-stakes capacity, he was tasked with navigating relations with the forces, which included identifying local individuals acting as traitors or threats to the community's survival. This role gave him immense influence and responsibility over the life and safety of the area's residents during a chaotic era.

Following the war, his enduring leadership led the community to unanimously adopt his nickname, "Capitan Bayong," as the official name of the barangay in 1969 to symbolize local unity and resolve a naming dispute between the sitios of Macopa and Patulangan.

=== Land area and use ===
It had a total land area of 105,117 hectares (259,750 acres), or 13% of the total land area of the province. 83% is classified as timberlands and 17% as alienable and disposable (A&D) lands. 72% of this A&D lands is devoted to agricultural production.

=== Rivers ===
- Pulangi River, the major source of the Rio Grande de Mindanao river system and also the longest river in bukidnon
- Dampilasan River, first of tributary of Pulangi River
- Atugan River, Main river in the municipality that passes along the Poblacion.
- Tagoloan River, A major River whose mouth is in Misamis Oriental
- Kalabugao River, It is a tributary of Pulangi river in Bukidnon

=== Climate ===
Impasugong is cool and moist throughout the year due to its high elevation ranging from 500 metres (1,600 ft) to more than 1,000 metres (3,300 ft) above sea level. It is a typhoon-free area ideal for the production of high-value crops. Average temperature ranges from 16 to 31 °C (61 to 88 °F) throughout the year.

Climate data for Impasugong, Bukidnon
Month	Jan	Feb	Mar	Apr	May	Jun	Jul	Aug	Sep	Oct	Nov	Dec	Year
Mean daily maximum °C (°F)	25 (77)	25 (77)	26 (79)	28 (82)	27 (81)	27 (81)	26 (79)	27 (81)	27 (81)	26 (79)	26 (79)	26 (79)	26 (80)
Mean daily minimum °C (°F)	20 (68)	19 (66)	19 (66)	20 (68)	21 (70)	21 (70)	21 (70)	21 (70)	21 (70)	21 (70)	21 (70)	20 (68)	20 (69)
Average precipitation mm (inches)	152 (6.0)	103 (4.1)	80 (3.1)	79 (3.1)	185 (7.3)	275 (10.8)	292 (11.5)	319 (12.6)	298 (11.7)	275 (10.8)	195 (7.7)	120 (4.7)	2,373 (93.4)
Average rainy days	16.2	12.9	13.1	14.4	25.9	28.5	29.9	29.6	28.4	27.8	22.0	16.4	265.1
Source: Meteoblue

== Demographics ==
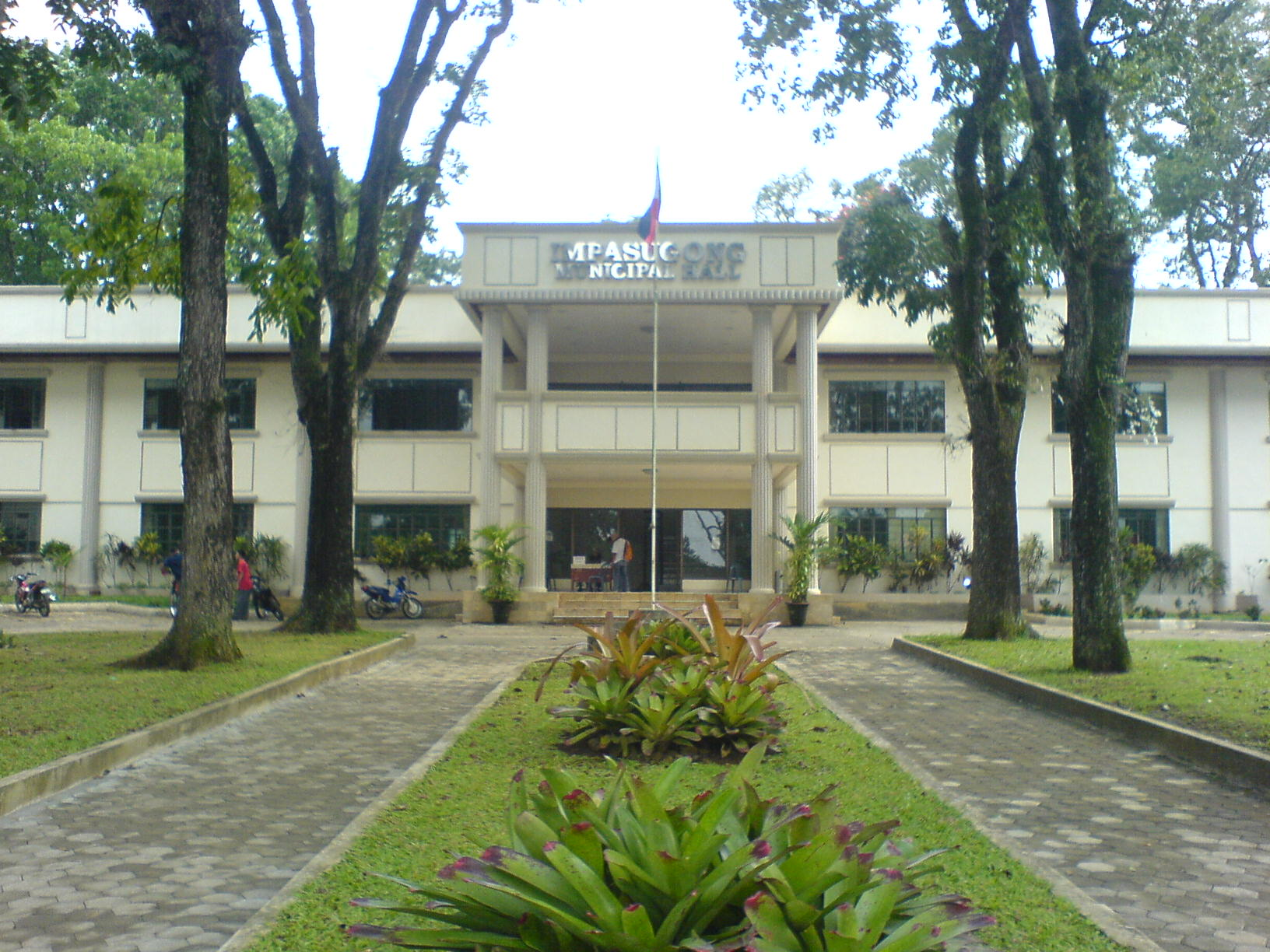
Municipal Hall

Population census of Impasugong
Year	Pop.	±% p.a.
1918	2,386	—
1939	3,627	+2.01%
1948	3,813	+0.56%
1960	6,063	+3.94%
1970	9,169	+4.22%
1975	11,911	+5.39%
1980	14,803	+4.44%
1990	22,629	+4.34%
1995	25,389	+2.18%
2000	31,173	+4.50%
2007	39,315	+3.25%
2010	43,587	+3.83%
2015	47,859	+1.80%
2020	53,863	+2.52%
2024	55,901	+0.90%
Source: Philippine Statistics Authority

In the 2024 census, the population of Impasugong was 55,901 people, with a density of 53 inhabitants per square kilometre or 140 inhabitants per square mile.

== Economy ==
Poverty incidence of Impasugong (%)

Source: Philippine Statistics Authority

=== Major crops ===
The major crops grown by farmers in the municipality are corn, pineapple, rice, coffee, sugarcane, banana, vegetables (mostly temperate types such as lettuce, broccoli, cabbage), abacá, fruits, and legumes.

=== Livestock ===
There are 9 commercial cattle farms in the area holding 1,143 heads in all. The LGU also manages a communal ranch in a 649-hectare land that holds 300 heads of cattle. This supports the dispersal and breed improvement program of the municipality.

There are also 28 commercial poultry breeder farms in the municipality with an estimated combined population of 775,000 heads.

=== Ecotourism ===
CEDAR or Center for Ecological Development and Recreation, situated beside the highway in barangay Impalutao, is the main entity backed by the Local Government Unit of Bukidnon and DENR (Department of Environment and Natural Resources) to promote eco-tourism in the province. It has a total land area of about 1,703 hectares. 373 hectares is covered by the man-made and natural forest. It has an elevation of 600 to 1200 meters above sea level with Mount Kibuwa as the highest. A 100-hectare rattan plantation exists in the area. The CEDAR was developed because of the reforestation efforts of the government of Bukidnon. Now dubbed as “An Eco-tourism Site in the Heart of Bukidnon”, it was declared as a protected area and was managed by the government since 1912. It is equipped with man-made swimming pool, sourcing from the natural springs surrounding the area and has five major waterfalls with three being the most accessible.
