= Cagayan River (Mindanao) =

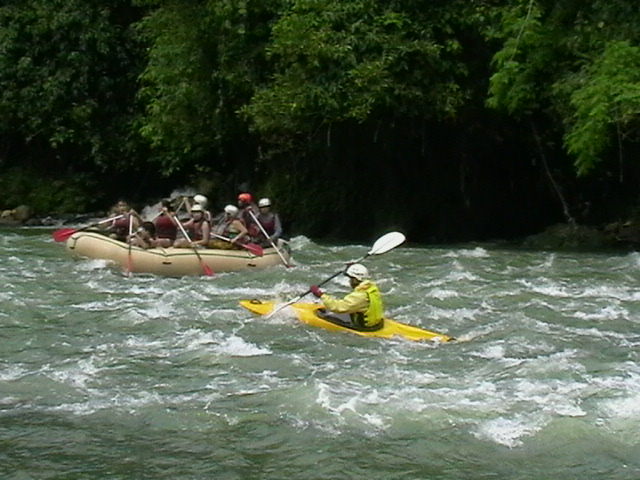
- Whitewater rafting along the Cagayan de Oro River

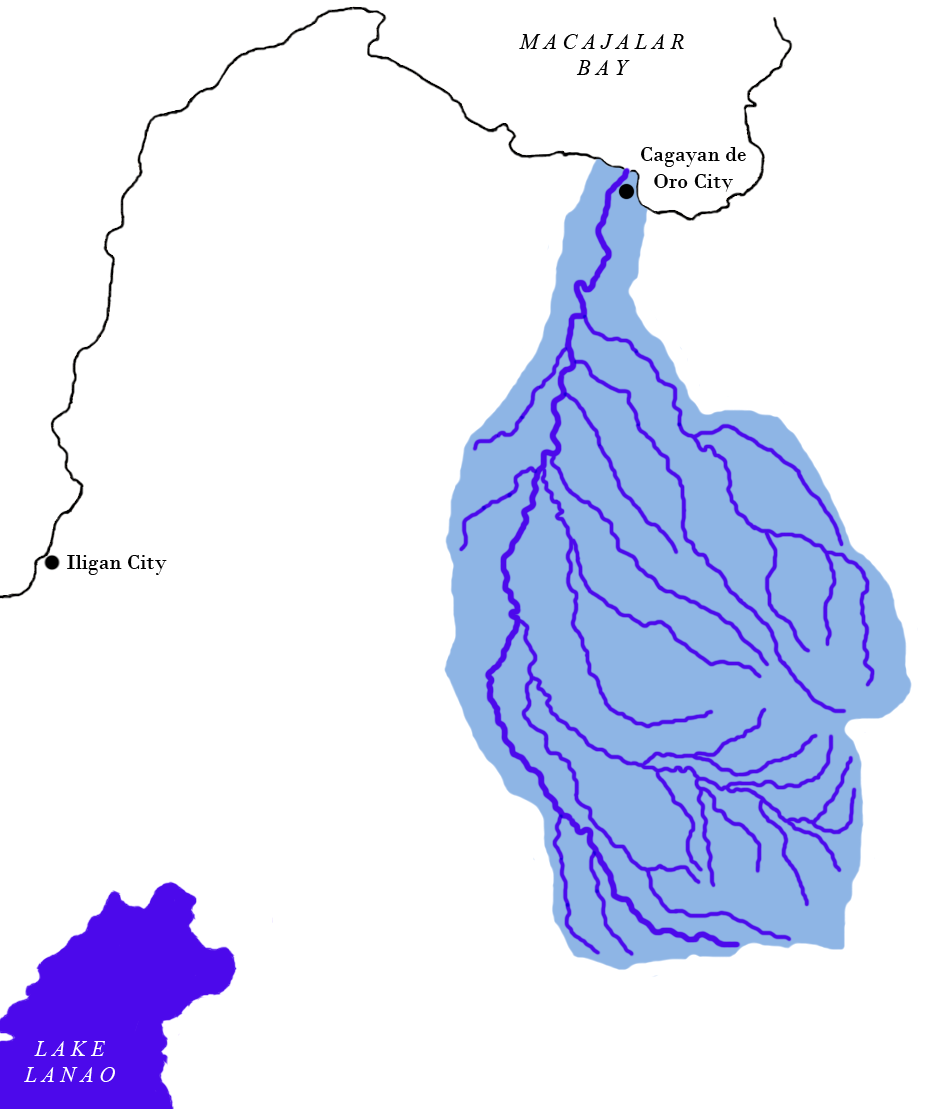
- A watershed map of the Cagayan de Oro River showing its major tributaries

- Cagayan de Oro River mouth Cagayan River (Mindanao) (Philippines)

Location
- Country: Philippines
- Region: Northern Mindanao
- Province: Bukidnon; Misamis Oriental
- City/municipality: Talakag; Baungon; Libona; Iligan; Cagayan de Oro

Physical characteristics
- Source: Kitanglad Mountain Range
  - location: Kalatungan Mountain Range, Bukidnon, Northern Mindanao, Philippines
  - coordinates: 7°57′27″N 124°48′57″E
  - elevation: 2,286 m (7,500 ft)
- Mouth: Macajalar Bay
  - location: Cagayan de Oro, Northern Mindanao, Philippines
  - coordinates: 8°30′18″N 124°39′27″E
  - elevation: 0 m (0 ft)
- Length: 90 km (56 mi)
- Basin size: 1,521 km^{2} (587 sq mi)
- Discharge
  - location: Macajalar Bay

Basin features
- Tributaries
  - right: Kalawaig River; Tagite River; Bubunaoan River

The Cagayan River, also known as the Cagayan de Oro River, is one of the rivers draining the northern central part of the island of Mindanao in the Philippines. The river has its headwaters in the Kalatungan Mountain Range and Kitanglad Mountain Range found in the central part of the province of Bukidnon. It traverses the municipalities of Talakag, Baungon, and Libona, connecting tributaries along the way. It finally empties into Macajalar Bay in Cagayan de Oro.

The river serves as the natural boundary between the province of Bukidnon and Iligan and between Bukidnon and Cagayan de Oro, based on the administrative order issued by the defunct Department of Mindanao and Sulu during the American occupation of the Philippines. In Cagayan de Oro, it is the dividing line between its two Congressional districts.

The Cagayan River is a very popular site for whitewater rafting in the Philippines and has been promoted by the Department of Tourism as the main tourist attraction of Cagayan de Oro.

== Etymology ==
The original name of the river is Kalambaguasasahan River, because of the presence of Lambago trees (Hibiscus tiliaceus, a member of the Malvaceae tree family that only thrives in low altitude areas like seashores, riverbanks and other areas reached by tidal streams) along the river banks. During the arrival of the Spaniards in Cagayan de Oro, the name was changed to Cagayan River.

The name of the river Cagayan comes from the Malayo-Polynesian word "Ag", which means water. "Kagay" means river and "Kagayan" is place with a river. This river is not to be confused with the country's longest and largest river of the same name located in northern Luzon, despite sharing similar etymology with each other.

== Geography ==
=== Course ===
The river's headwaters is found in the Kalatungan Mountain Range, in the central portion of the province of Bukidnon. It flows northward towards Cagayan de Oro for about 90 kilometres (56 mi) before emptying into Macajalar Bay.

=== Drainage Area ===
The river drains an area of approximately 1,521 square kilometres (587 sq mi). About 80% of the drainage basin is located in the Province of Bukidnon and the rest is in Iligan and Cagayan de Oro.

=== Tributaries ===
The main tributaries of the Cagayan de Oro River are the following:

- Kalawaig River
- Tagite River
- Bubunaoan River
- Tumalaong River

=== Mouth ===
The river's mouth is located in Cagayan de Oro. After a 90-kilometre (56 mi) course from the mountains of Bukidnon, the river finally discharges its load to Macajalar Bay.

== Tourism ==
=== Whitewater rafting and kayaking ===
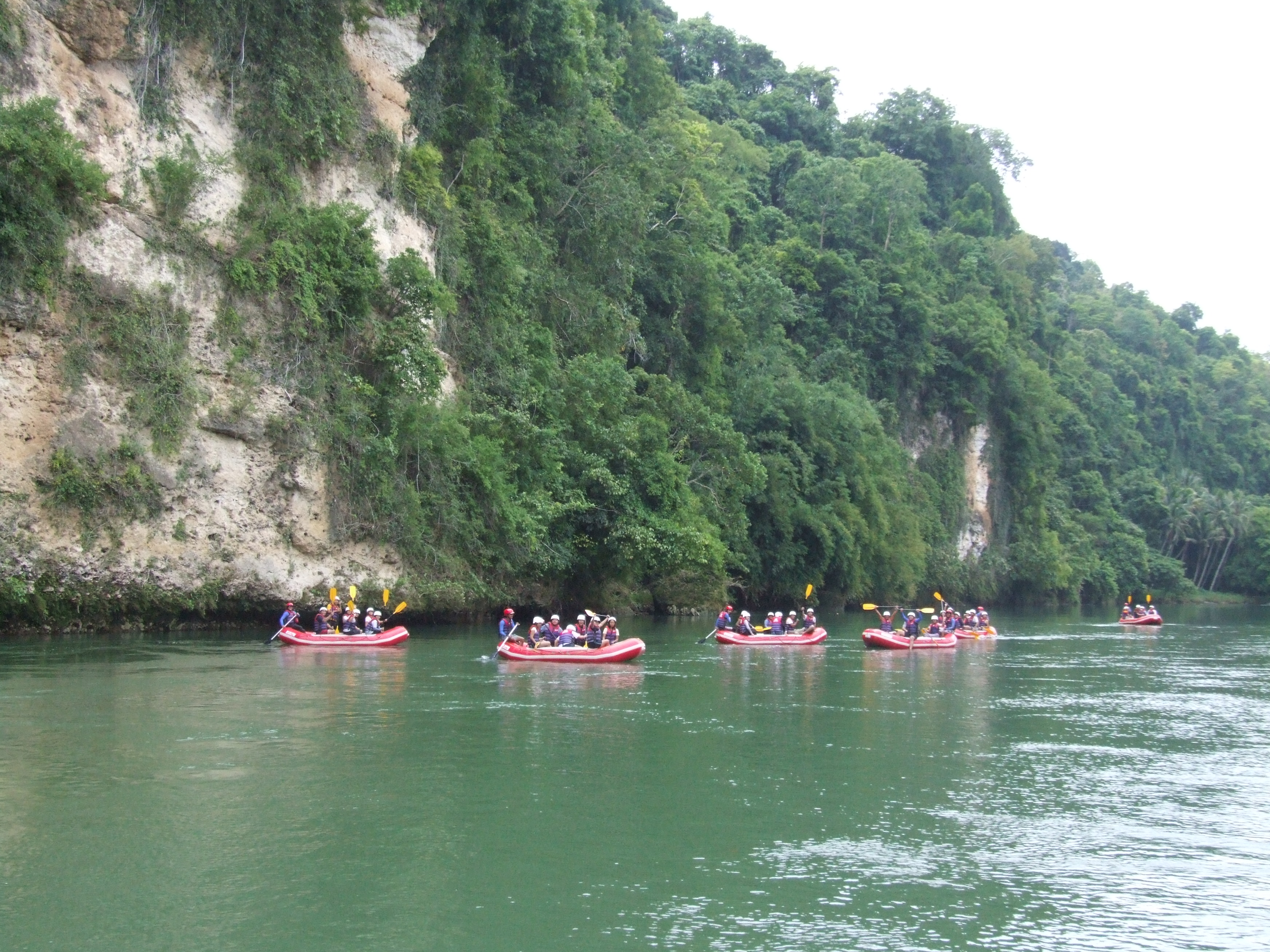
Whitewater rafting and river trekking along the river

Whitewater rafting, kayaking and river trekking has been one of the tourism activities being promoted in the river. The city administration and the Department of Tourism made it as the banner tourism activity in Cagayan de Oro. The jump-off point of the river, whitewater rafting is at Barangay Mambuaya, a 30-40 minute ride from the city proper.

Recently, whitewater rafting in the Cagayan River is gaining popularity through the years after President Gloria Macapagal Arroyo and other famous personalities in the country have tried the challenging whitewater rafting in the river.

=== Rio de Oro Boulevard ===
The 2.5-kilometer two-lane Rio de Oro Boulevard along the Cagayan de Oro River is a major tourist attraction. It connects from Barangay Puntod, J.R. Borja Streets, CM Recto Avenue-Marcos Bridge and Consolacion with three-way junction to Burgos Street. Inaugurated in August 2023, the Cagayan de Oro River flood management project was financed by the Japanese International Cooperation Agency. ROB is host to the Pasko de Oro festival of December 2023 after the August Higalaay Festival. The boulevard's "Tree of Life" historical marker was installed at Isla De Oro along the CDO river as memorial to the mango shelter for 50 natives during the 2011 typhoon Tropical Storm Washi.

== Fishery ==
The stream is an important seasonal freshwater artisanal fishery producing an annual catch, as of 2016, of about US$500,000 from an average weekly catch of 5 to 15 kilograms (11 to 33 lb) by each fisherman. In the lower reaches of the stream, this low catch of smaller immature fish is evidence of lack of management of the fishery. Less than 1% to as much as 10% of the local population may be engaged at least part-time as fishermen, most are men. Full-time fishermen earn about US$1,000 to 2,000 per year, which is below the poverty line. Gill nets, cast nets, long lines, fish hooks and line sets, spears, traps and traditional fishing boats are used. The catch includes Snapper (Aha-an), Flagtail (Aligaman), Crab (Alimango), Red-tailed goby (Anga), Squaretail mullet (Balanak), Goby (Batinga), Silver perch (Bugaong), Otomebora Mullet (Bunak), Indo-Pacific Tarpon (Buwan-buwan), Loach goby (Dalapakan), Mountain bass (Damagan), Indian pellona (Ibis), Flathead grey mullet (Gisaw), Gourami (Gurami), Mudfish (Halu-an), Shrimp (Hipon, Goby (Iswil), Carp (Karpa), Eel (Kasili), Spotted Scat (Kikilo), Mullet (Muli), Cyprinidae (Pait), Catfish (Pantat), Rock goby (Pigok), Mangrove red snapper (Tadlungan), Tilapia.

== See also ==
- Cagayan de Oro
- Macajalar Bay
- Bukidnon
