= Bubunaoan River =

River in Mindanao, Philippines

Location
- Country: Philippines

Basin features
- Progression: Bubunaoan–Cagayan

The Bubunaoan River is a river of the Philippines. It is a tributary of the Cagayan River.
