= Kalabugao River =

River in Bukidnon, Philippines

- Kalabugao River mouth Kalabugao River (Philippines)

Location
- Country: Philippines
- Region: Northern Mindanao
- Province: Bukidnon
- City/municipality: Impasugong

Physical characteristics
- Mouth: Pulangi River
  - coordinates: 8°25′55″N 125°10′39″E

Basin features
- Progression: Kalabugao–Pulangi–Mindanao

The Kalabugao River is a river located in the municipality of Impasugong in Bukidnon province in the Philippines. It is a tributary of the Pulangi River.

In 2014, the Philippine government budgeted for infrastructure projects targeting the Kalabugao Plain, which includes restoration of the river with fishing regulation and reforestation.

== See also ==
- List of rivers of the Philippines
