= Bobonawan River =

River in Bukidnon, Philippines

- Bobonawan River mouth Bobonawan River (Philippines)

Location
- Country: Philippines
- Region: Northern Mindanao
- Province: Bukidnon

Physical characteristics
- Mouth: Pulangi River
  - coordinates: 8°00′08″N 125°18′49″E

Basin features
- Progression: Bobonawan–Pulangi–Mindanao

The Bobonawan River is a river in Bukidnon in Mindanao, Philippines. It is a tributary of the Pulangi River.
