= Muleta River =

River in Mindanao, Philippines

- Location within Mindanao mainland Location within Philippines

Location
- Country: Philippines
- Region: Northern Mindanao
- Province: Bukidnon

Physical characteristics
- Mouth: Pulangi River
  - coordinates: 7°17′39″N 124°51′36″E

Basin features
- Progression: Muleta–Pulangi–Mindanao

The Muleta River is a river draining the southern central portion of the province of Bukidnon in the southern island of Mindanao, Philippines. It is one of the major tributaries of the Pulangi River, which drains into the Rio Grande de Mindanao in Cotabato.

It is one of the major watersheds of Bukidnon which is considered as the food basket of Mindanao (Dacumos, 2012–07). Due to its wide agricultural area, Muleta watershed is a great factor in affecting the water quality of the bigger Pulangi River and the much bigger Rio de Grande. Muleta watershed consists of municipalities and city which agriculture is their major industry. Some of the companies that operate inside the area of Muleta Watershed are Dole, MCADC and Sumifru which has a large land area covered. Due to this, fertilizer and sediment runoff are the problems Muleta River is facing today (Ara, A., 2017)
