= Pulangi River =

River in Mindanao, Philippines

Pulangi River Pulangui River
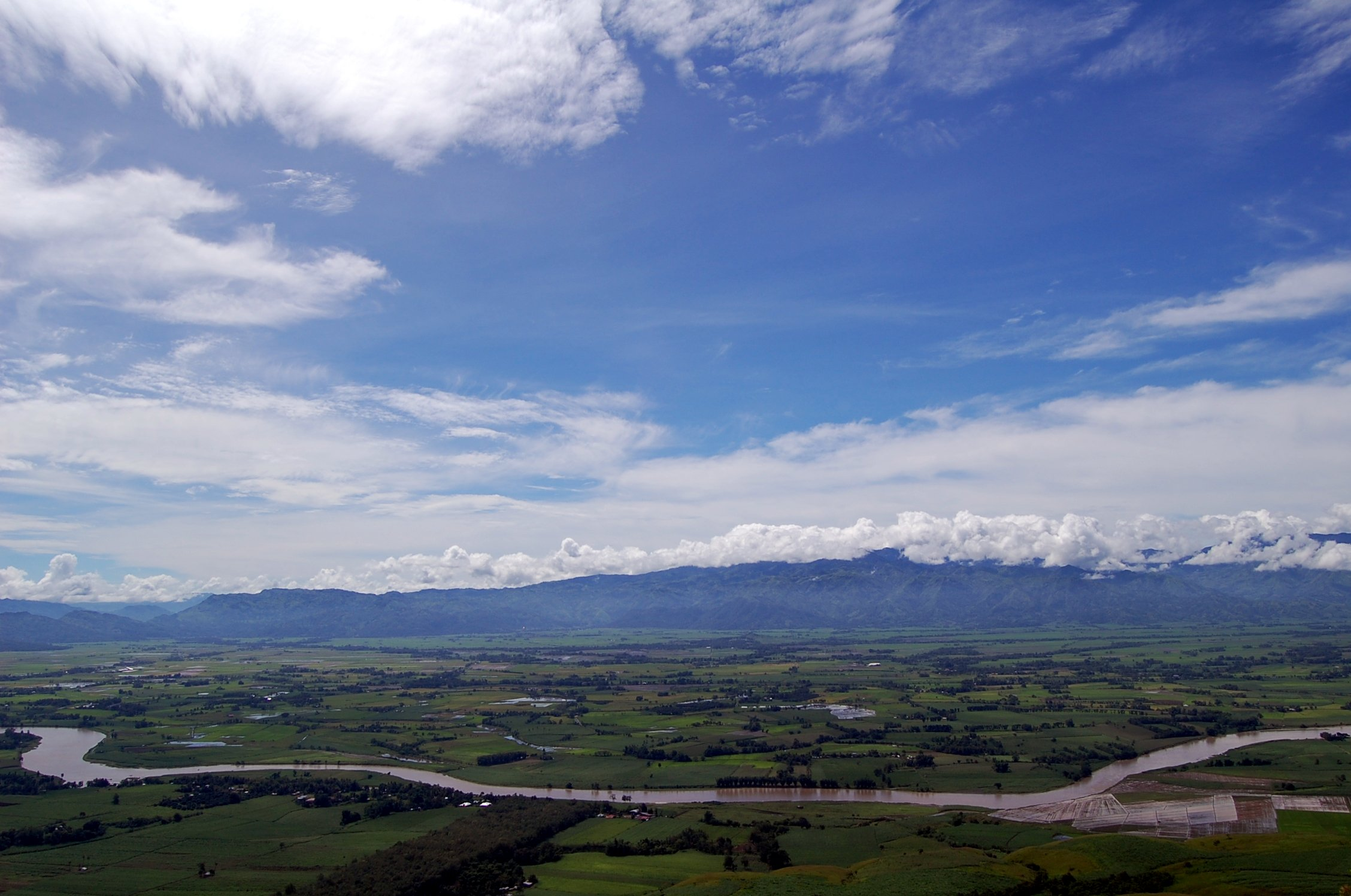
- The Pulangi River, winding through the Maapag Plain in Valencia City, is one of the major tributaries of the Rio Grande de Mindanao

- Location within Mindanao mainland Location within Philippines
- Etymology: Empamulangi (center of the island); Pulangi (river)
- Native name: Suba sa Pulangi (Cebuano); Pulangi a Pulangi (Maguindanaon)

Location
- Country: Philippines
- Region: Northern Mindanao; Soccsksargen; BARMM
- Province: Bukidnon; Cotabato

Physical characteristics
- Source: Mangabon Range
  - location: Brgy. Kalabugao, Impasugong, Bukidnon
- Mouth: Mindanao River
  - coordinates: 7°08′38″N 124°48′12″E
- Length: 320 km (199 mi)

Basin features
- Progression: Pulangi–Mindanao
- Tributaries
  - left: Bobonawan River; Sawaga River; Manupali River; Muleta River; Maradugao River; Malitubog River; Maramag River
  - right: Tigwa River; Kabacan River; Dampilasan River; Maapag River; Laligan River; Kalabugao River; Tinanan River; Kulaman River; Arakan River

The Pulangi River (Cebuano pronunciation IPA [puˈlaŋi]); (Maguindanaon pronunciation: [pʊˈlaːŋɪ]), also spelled Pulangui, is one of the major tributaries of the Rio Grande de Mindanao, an extensive river system in Mindanao, Philippines. With a length of 320 kilometres (199 mi), it is the longest river in Bukidnon and the 5th longest river in the Philippines. It traverses through majority of the cities and municipalities of Bukidnon from its source in Barangay Kalabugao, Impasugong, Bukidnon.

== History ==
=== Etymology ===
The name of the river could have come from the Manobo term empamulangi, meaning "center of the island", referring to the location of the river within the island of Mindanao. In Maguindanaon, the word pulangi means "river".

=== Watershed and hydroelectric plant ===
Pulangi has one reservoir type power plant, the Pulangi IV Hydroelectric Plant and watershed. The Pulangi IV Hydroelectric Plant has a capacity of 255 megawatts and provides for 25% of Mindanao's power needs. It is owned and operated by the National Power Corporation (NAPOCOR). The reservoir and dam is also the main water source for the province of Bukidnon, both for drinking water and for irrigation through the National Irrigation Administration (NIA).

The Pulangi IV Hydroelectric Plant watershed (also known as the Upper Pulangi Watershed) is the second largest watershed in the Philippines, covering an area of around 1.8 Million hectares. It has ten catchments and covers the cities and municipalities of Impasugong, Cabanglasan, San Fernando, Lantapan, Maramag, Quezon, Valencia City, and Malaybalay City.

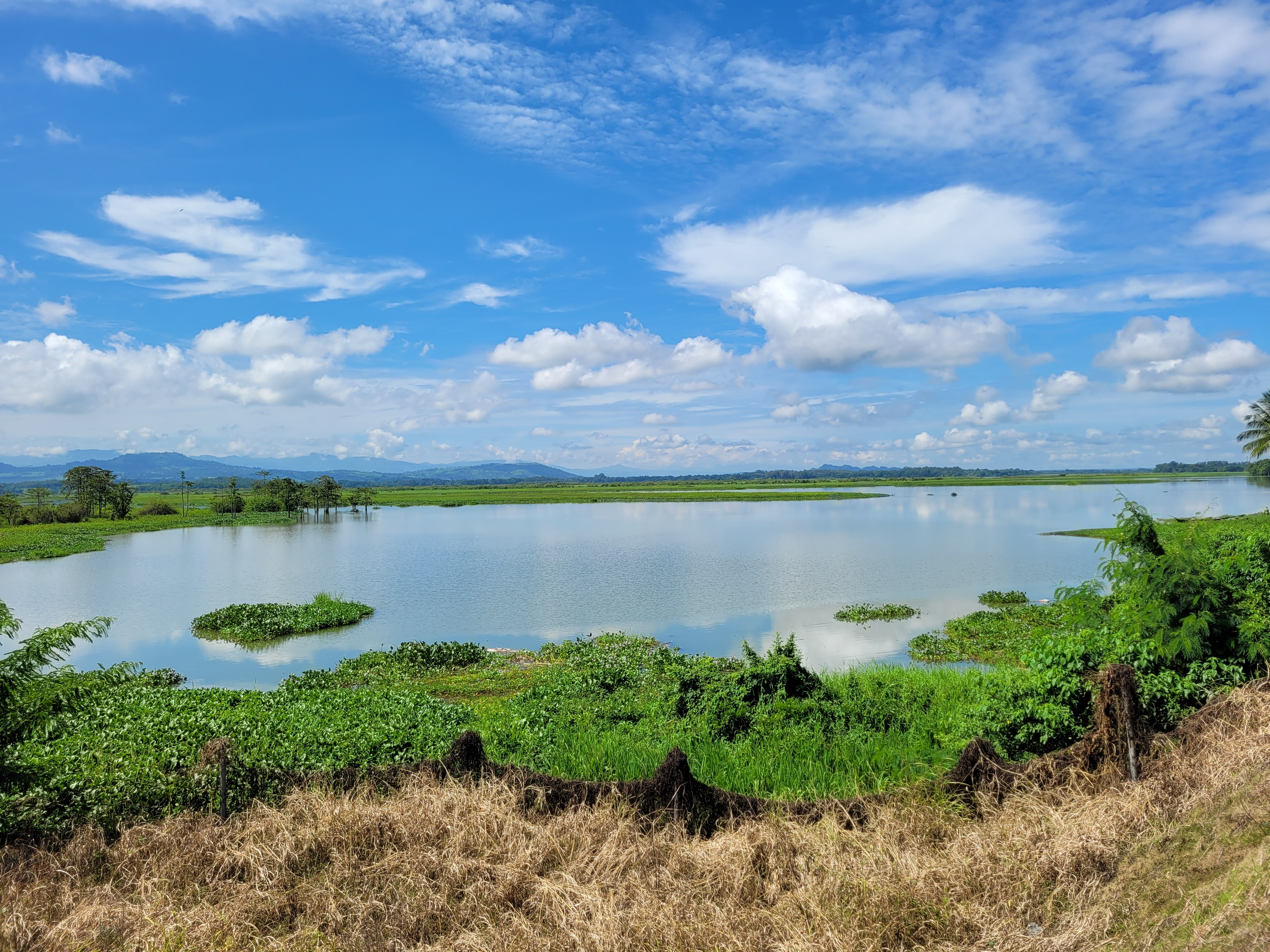
View of the Pulangi Lake

The artificial lake created by the reservoir proper is called the Pulangi Lake or the Maramag Basin. It has a surface area of about 1,985 hectares and a live storage of 67 million cubic meters.

Pulangi is also the site of the proposed Pulangi V Hydroelectric Dam. The project is expected to generate 300 megawatts of renewable energy for Mindanao in southern Philippines. The dam is 3,300 hectares covering portions, mostly highly sloping lands along the riverbank in 22 barangays in Kitaotao, Kibawe, Dangcagan and Damulog in Bukidnon and Roxas town in North Cotabato, including the Carmen Bridge Border Kabacan Carmen) North Cotabato. Of the total dam area, 40% is the present river itself and the inundated areas are stiff slopes along the river bank. An estimated 1,060 households will be affected, all of whom will be relocated and compensated by the project.

Opposition to the project have claimed that the project would submerge the burial site of Apo Mamalu, a revered ancestor of the Manobo indigenous people in Mindanao. There, however, are conflicting claims to this.

The National Museum of the Philippines commissioned a team of experts to look into this claim, but as of February 6, 2011, the anthropologist asked to study the claim in response to a petition to declare Sitio Mikasili, Barangay Tangkulan, Damulog as a National Heritage Site said that there is not enough evidence to declare it as such. Dr. Antonio Montalvan, an anthropologist who earlier supported the petition to declare the site as a heritage site wrote the National Museum saying that after deeper scrutiny of the claims, a declaration of a National Heritage site is not feasible. Montalvan said: "Such an important declaration cannot be made when the assumptions lack unanimity and more so in material evidence. This may only lead to an obfuscation of the ethno-cultural importance and beautiful traditions of the ancient Manobo peoples."

== Geography ==
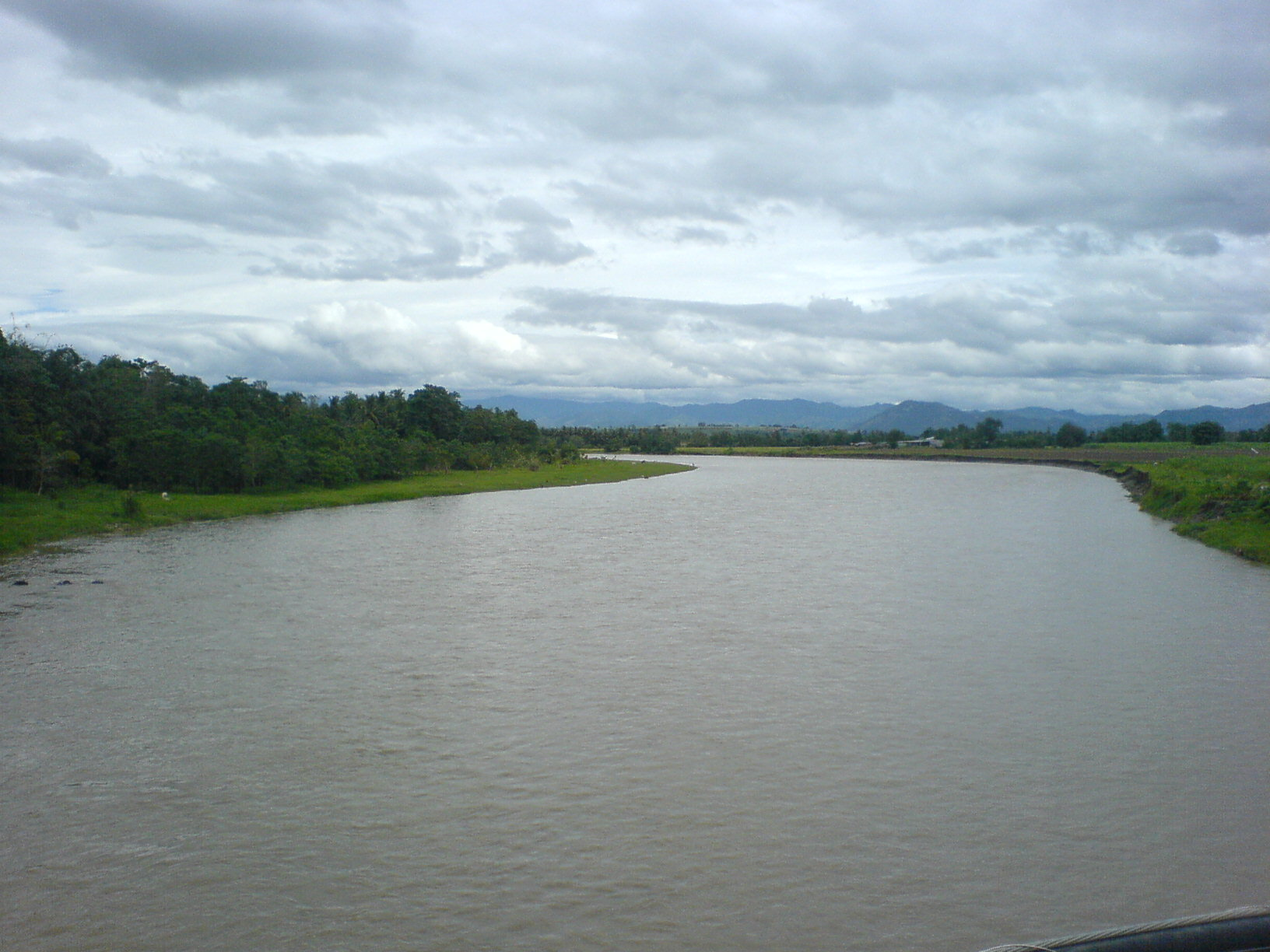
Pulangi River in Valencia City, Bukidnon

=== Sources ===
Barangay Kalabugao, Impasugong, Bukidnon,

Other Sources: Mount Dulang-dulang, Kitanglad Mountain Range, Mount Kalatungan, Mount Mangabon Misamis Oriental

=== Tributaries ===
The Manupali River, a major tributary of the Pulangi River, starts in the mountains of Lantapan, Bukidnon, picking up tributaries along the way from the Kalatungan and Kitanglad Mountain Ranges. It forms part of the natural boundary of Valencia City and Lantapan. It flows eastward towards Malaybalay City, eventually joining the Pulangi River in Valencia City.

The Muleta River is found in the southern portion of the province covering the municipalities of Pangantucan, Don Carlos, Kitaotao, Dangcagan, Kibawe, Kadingilan and Damulog. It is another important tributary of the Pulangi River and flows southward. It will join the Pulangi River in the boundary of Bukidnon and Cotabato province.

The Bobonawan River, found in the municipality of Cabanglasan, is another tributary of the Pulangi River. It covers most of the parts of the municipality, flowing southward towards Pulangi River.

Other tributaries are the Tigwa River of San Fernando, Bukidnon, the Maradugao River. Kalabugao River of Impasugong, Bukidnon Sawaga River of Malaybalay City. Abuhan River and Balongkot River of Managok, Malaybalay City. Kabacan River in Cotabato, Dampilasan River in Impasugong, Maapag River of Valencia, Laligan River of Valencia, and the Malitubog River in Cotabato.

== Cultural diversity ==
Indigenous Higaonon communities that have settled around the headwater of Pulangi identify themselves as Pulangiyen. Their Indigenous knowledge systems include environmental and biodiversity conservation. The Pulangi watershed extends to the ancestral domain of Higaonon and Bukidnon Indigenous communities. The watershed supplies water to rice paddies and agricultural areas in the barangays of Hagpa and Kalabugao.
