= Mount Kalatungan =

Volcanic mountain in Bukidnon, Philippines

- Keretungan (Manobo languages); Calatungan
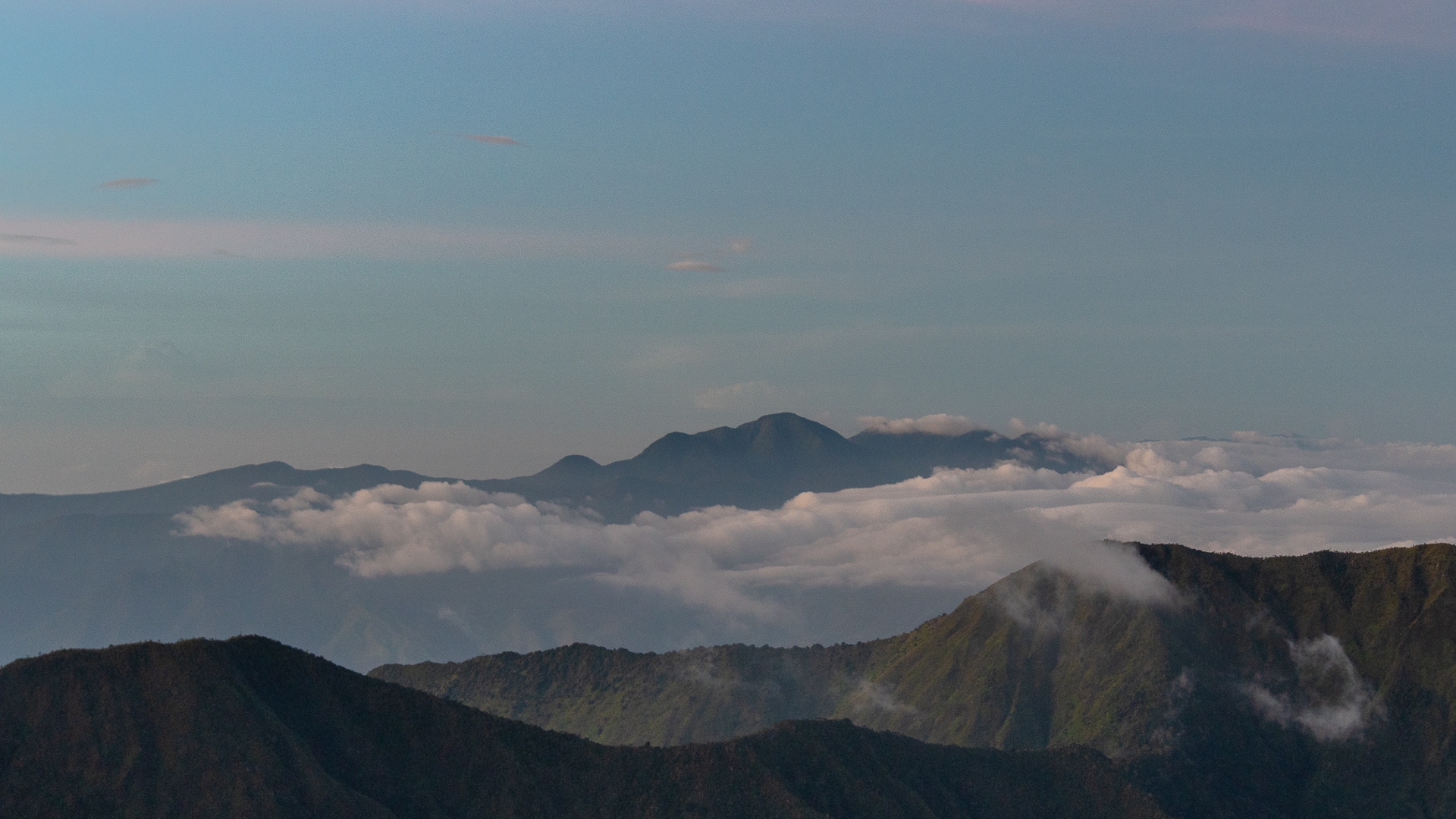
- Aerial view of Kalatungan Mountain Range

Highest point
- Elevation: 2,880 m (9,450 ft)
- Prominence: 1,502 m (4,928 ft)
- Listing: Philippines highest peaks 5th; Philippines ultra peaks 31st; Ribu; Potentially active volcano
- Coordinates: 7°57′18″N 124°48′09″E

Geography
- Location within Mindanao mainland Location within Philippines
- Country: Philippines
- Region: Northern Mindanao
- Province: Bukidnon
- Cities and municipalities: Maramag; Pangantucan; Talakag; Valencia
- Parent range: Kalatungan Mountain Range

Geology
- Rock age: Holocene
- Mountain type: Stratovolcano
- Last eruption: Unknown

Mount Kalatungan, also known as Keretungan by the indigenous Manobo people, is a volcano located in the province of Bukidnon in the southern Philippines. It is a stratovolcano with no known historical eruptions and classified by the Philippine Institute of Volcanology and Seismology (PHIVOLCS) as a potentially active volcano. It is the fifth highest mountain in the Philippines and is an indigenous and community conserved area (ICCA).

== Description ==
Mount Kalatungan is the fifth highest mountain in the country with an elevation of 2,880 m (9,450 ft) asl. It is one of the several high elevation peaks in the Kalatungan Mountain Range in Bukidnon on the island of Mindanao, the second largest island in the Philippines.

=== Ancestral domain ===
The mountain is part of the ancestral domain of the indigenous Manobo and Talaandig people. It is inhabited by around 531 households (2,652 people) as of 2015. The Manobo comprise 85% of the population, while the remaining 15% is composed of the Talaandig and the non-indigenous Dumagat (recent Visayan settlers). The ancestral domain covers approximately 3,242 hectares (8,010 acres) of the Kalatungan mountain range in Bukidnon. It includes six barangays, namely Nabaliwa, Bacusanon, Concepcion, Mendis, and Pigtauranan in the municipality of Pangantucan; and Dominorog in the municipality of Talakag.

== Conservation ==
Mount Kalatungan is regarded as a "sacred forest" (Idsesenggilaha) by the indigenous peoples in the area. It was formally declared as an Indigenous and community conserved area (ICCA) in 8 February 2012, through a ritual known as Gulugundu by participating tribes. Anyone wishing to enter the area must obtain permission from the Ebmegurangen (the council of elders) of the indigenous tribes, as well as follow the rules, regulations, and policies outlined by the ICCA.

As a sacred environment, the regulations of the ICCA are partly based on ancestral beliefs as revealed to the Datu or Bai (male or female community leaders, respectively) and the Beylan (shaman).

== Mythology ==
The summit of the mountain is known as Apu ("revered elder", compare with Mount Apo) by the Manobo people, because it is believed to be the abode of a spirit of the mountain (collectively known as Elembiten, "invoked spirits"). The spirits work in a hierarchy of spiritual beings known as Kedelisayan, and are regarded guardians and nurturers of the tribes.

In the Manobo mythology, the whole mountain was formerly known as Apu before the great flood submerged the lands and only the tip of the mountain remained above water as a small island. This island was known as Keretung where a human survivor named Apu Agbibilin and two trees remain. The two trees were closely-spaced and when the wind blew against them, it caused them to rub against each other and emit a spark that became a small flame. Apu Agbibilin used the flame to build a fire which emitted smoke. The smoke was seen by survivors also stranded on the peaks of other mountains. They came to Apu Agbibilin to ask for fire and from them arose a new people known as the Menuvù (Manobo).

== FA-50PH crash ==
On March 4, 2025, a Philippine Air Force FA-50PH fighter jet crashed in Mt. Kalatungan during a night operation. The aircraft, carrying two crew members, lost communication while providing air support to ground forces in Cabanglasan, Bukidnon. Search teams later found the wreckage, confirming no survivors.

== See also ==
- Mount Kitanglad
- List of mountains in the Philippines
- List of Southeast Asian mountains
- List of active volcanoes in the Philippines
- List of potentially active volcanoes in the Philippines
- List of inactive volcanoes in the Philippines
