= Maradugao River =

River in Mindanao, Philippines

Maradugao River: Maridugao River; Maridagao River
- Location within Mindanao mainland Location within Philippines

Location
- Country: Philippines
- Region: Northern Mindanao; Bangsamoro Autonomous Region
- Province: Bukidnon; Lanao del Sur

Physical characteristics
- Source: Kalatungan Mountain Range; Mount Piapayungan
- Mouth: Mal-Mar River
  - coordinates: 7°11′17″N 124°42′36″E

Basin features
- Progression: Maradugao–Mal-Mar River—Mindanao

The Maradugao River (also called Maridugao and Maridagao) is a river that serves as a natural boundary between the provinces of Bukidnon and Lanao del Sur in Mindanao in southern Philippines. It joins the Pulangi River in Cotabato.

== Sources ==
The river headwaters originate from the Kalatungan Mountain Range and Mount Piapayungan eventually emptying at the Pulangi River.

== Dam ==
The Malitubog-Maridagao Dam (also known as Mal-Mar Dam) is an irrigation project by the National Irrigation Administration.
