= Mimi Miyagi =

American pornographic actress (born 1973)

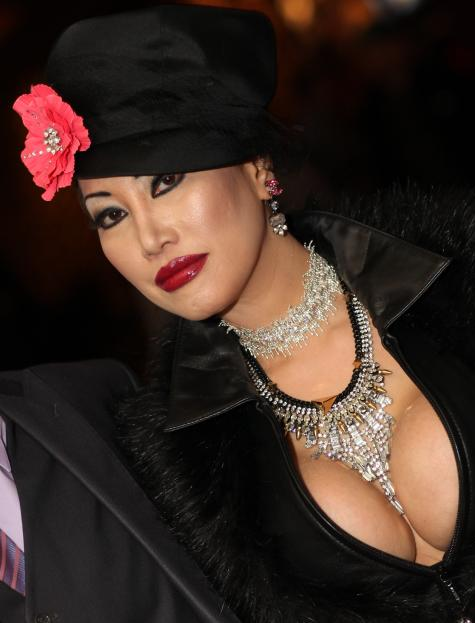
- Miyagi at the 2013 AVN Awards at the Hard Rock Hotel & Casino in Las Vegas
- Born: Melody Damayo; July 3, 1973 (age 53); Davao City, Philippines
- Other names: Miyaki, Mimi Myagi, Myagi, Miyagi
- Occupations: Model; film director; pornographic actress
- Height: 5 ft 3 in (1.60 m)
- Website: mimimiyagi.com

Melody Damayo (born July 3, 1973), known professionally as Mimi Miyagi, is a Filipino-American model, film director, and former pornographic actress.

In 2011, Complex magazine ranked her at #12 in their list of "The Top 50 Hottest Asian Porn Stars of All Time".

== Early life and education ==
Melody Damayo was born in Davao City, the second of four children, to conservative Seventh-day Adventist parents. When she was six, she moved to the United States with her parents, and she grew up in California.

Damayo went back to Mindanao for high school, and her family enrolled her in a Seventh-day Adventist academy (Mindanao Mission Academy) in Misamis Oriental, hoping she would absorb Filipino values. After finishing high school, she enrolled in an Adventist college in Bukidnon, studying finance and economics at Mountain View College, but she dropped out in her second year. She says she had been a disc jockey on the college radio station and had decided on a career in show business.

== Career ==
Damayo returned to Los Angeles and obtained a scholarship to the American College for Fashion Merchandising, but, once again, she dropped out without graduating when she had run out of money and began looking for jobs. By age 18, she had intended to be a makeup artist.

She took some part-time gigs as a go-go dancer at an Asian nightclub in Beverly Hills, before transitioning into adult films and nude modeling.

Damayo says she saw an advertisement for nude models and answered it. She took the name "Mimi", the childhood nickname given by her grandmother. "Miyagi" was derived from the character Mr. Miyagi in the film The Karate Kid, although she has nothing to do with him. She says she cloaked her actual ethnicity in Asian mysticism.

In 1996, she retired from adult film acting and moved to Henderson, Nevada. She married a former professional football player. She hired a consultant to set up a website (MimiMiyagi.com), then got embroiled in a legal battle over control of the domain name.

In 1998, she appeared in an America Undercover documentary entitled Strippers: The Naked Stages.

She was the publisher of the erotic American Asian magazine Oriental Dolls (now known as Asian Hotties).

In 2001, after a divorce, she quietly dedicated herself to several humanitarian and animal volunteer organizations.

Nearly bankrupted by her divorce, in September 2003, "Mimi" came out of retirement and appeared in the adult film Happy Ending (not to be confused with Happy Endings later released by Lions Gate Entertainment).

She again transitioned out of the adult film industry in 2007 and starting acting in mainstream movies like Little Bruno. She also had a cameo role in the 2013 mainstream movie Speed Dragon.

In 2012, she became a fashion reporter for Eyestrane, an online magazine focusing on Asian talent internationally.

== Political career ==
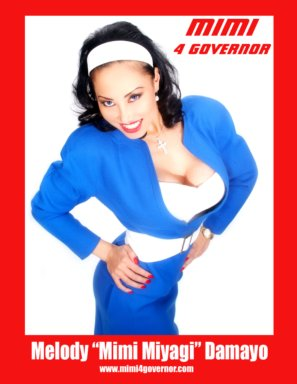
Campaign poster, Nevada gubernatorial election, 2006. Courtesy of Mimi Miyagi.

On May 12, 2006, she filed as a Republican gubernatorial candidate in the state of Nevada, under her birth name Melody Damayo, saying one of her priorities would be anti-stalking legislation. "I have nothing left to hide, everybody has seen all of me already", she said. One of her slogans was "I'm bare and honest at all times." Her candidacy came three years after fellow adult film star Mary Carey's campaign for Governor of California in the 2003 California gubernatorial recall election. On May 16, 2006, her campaign was endorsed by the liberal blog Wonkette.

She faced four other Republican candidates in the primary held on August 15, 2006, and was defeated by a wide margin by Jim Gibbons. After her loss in the primaries, she joined the Libertarian Party.
