= Mailag =

Mailag Sevilla
- Barangay
- Location within Mindanao mainland Location within Philippines
- Coordinates: 7°58′20.2″N 125°08′15.7″E
- Country: Philippines
- Province: Bukidnon
- City: Valencia

Government
  - Type: Barangay Council
  - Body: Sangguniang Barangay
  - Chairman: Louie John T. Naiz
- Elevation: 317 m (1,040 ft)

Population (2015)
  - Total: 6,805
- PSGC: 101321020
- IRA (2020): Php 6,424,840

Mailag (formerly Spanish: Sevilla) is an urban barangay in Valencia, Bukidnon, Philippines. According to the 2015 census, it has a population of 6,805 people.

== Profile ==
Mailag is situated in the north central portion of Valencia on the western bank of the Sawaga River. It is bounded to the north by Colonia and Bangcud of the City of Malaybalay, to the west by Santo Niño and Nabag-o, to the south by Bagontaas, and to the west by San Carlos. The barangay center is located near the Sawaga traversed by an old section of the Sayre Highway (now named the Bangcud-Mailag bypass road). The new section passes through Sitio Dabongdabong. It is primarily an agricultural community where rice, corn, and sugarcane are mainly produced. Commerce is a growing sector, particularly in Dabongdabong. A diversion road which bypasses the city centre (Poblacion) of Valencia starts in Mailag and terminates at Musuan.

The name Mailag is a Binukid word which means "transparent". It was founded in the late 19th century by Jesuit missionaries as the town of Sevilla. It encompasses the villages of Bugcaon, Calasungay, Covadonga (now Alanib), Linabo, Monserrat, Oroquieta (now Malaybalay), Silae, and Valencia. However, administration gradually transferred to Linabo since it has a larger population. During the American occupation, the province of Bukidnon was established and the government was reorganized. Municipal government was transferred to Malaybalay and Mailag was made one of its constituent barrios. A rural agricultural school was established in 1910 as Mailag Industrial School and eventually grew prompting its relocation to Managok and then in Musuan to become the Central Mindanao University. In 1935, its Sitio Bangcud was separated to become a full-fledged barrio. In 1961, Mailag was separated from Malaybalay to form the Municipality of Valencia to which it is still a member.
