= Mountain View College =

Mountain View College may refer to:

- Mountain View College (Philippines)
- Mountain View College (Texas)
