= Mountain View College Academy =

Private high school in Bukidnon, Philippines

Coordinates: 7°59.04′N 125°00.24′E

- Valencia City, Bukidnon, (Philippines); Philippines

Information
- Type: Private
- Established: 1952
- Principal: Chona A. Ramos
- Staff: 2
- Faculty: 15
- Grades: 7 to 12
- Enrollment: 130
- Colors: Yellow, Blue, white, green
- Athletics conference: CVAPSAA
- Affiliation: Seventh-day Adventist Church, Association of Christian Schools, Colleges, and Universities

Mountain View College Academy (or MVCA) is a private Adventist high school in Valencia City, Bukidnon, Philippines. It has an average student population of less than 200. It is located within the campus of Mountain View College. It also serves as the laboratory high school of the MVC School of Education. As of 2009, it has 14 teachers and 2 support staff. It is part of the Seventh-day Adventist Church's worldwide educational system.

== Curriculum ==
The schools curriculum consists primarily of the standard courses taught at college preparatory schools across the world. All students are required to take classes in the core areas of English, Basic Sciences, Mathematics, a Foreign Language, and Social Sciences.

== Spiritual aspects ==
All students take religion classes each year that they are enrolled. These classes cover topics in biblical history and Christian and denominational doctrines. Instructors in other disciplines also begin each class period with prayer or a short devotional thought, many which encourage student input. Weekly, the entire student body gathers together for an hour-long chapel service. Outside the classrooms there is year-round spiritually oriented programming that relies on student involvement.

== Athletics ==
The school offer the following sports:

- Soccer (boys & girls)
