= Poblacion (disambiguation) =

A poblacion is the central area of a Philippine city.

Poblacion may also refer to the following places in the Philippines:

- Poblacion, Alabel, Sarangani
- Poblacion, Kadingilan, Bukidnon,
- Poblacion, Kalibo, Aklan
- Poblacion, Makati, Manila
- Poblacion (Malapatan), Sarangani
- Poblacion, Malaybalay, Bukidnon
- Poblacion, Muntinlupa, Manila
- Poblacion, Pateros, Manila
- Poblacion, San Pascual (Batangas),
- Poblacion, Sibagat, Agusan del Sur
- Poblacion, Ubay, Bohol
