= Tabios =

Tabios is a surname. Notable people with the surname include:

- Eileen Tabios (born 1960), Filipino-American poet, fiction writer, conceptual/visual artist, editor, anthologist, critic, and publisher
- Gerald Tabios (born 1969), Filipino long-distance runner and Ultramarathon runner
