= Bangcud =

Settlement in the Philippines

- Barangay
- Map showing the location of Bangcud Bangcud (Philippines)
- Coordinates: 7°59′29.6″N 125°08′15.5″E
- Country: Philippines
- Province: Bukidnon
- City: Malaybalay
- District: South Highway District
- Barangayhood: 1935

Government
  - Type: Barangay Council
  - Body: Sangguniang Barangay
  - Chairman: Estela A. Edma

Area
  - Total: 15.75 km^{2} (6.08 sq mi)
- Elevation: 346.8 m (1,138 ft)

Population (2015)
  - Total: 5,111
  - Density: 324.5/km^{2} (840.5/sq mi)
- PSGC: 101312002
- IRA (2020): Php 4,988,571

Pantaron Range from Bangcud, Bukidnon, Philippines

Bangcud is an urban barangay in the South Highway District of Malaybalay City, Bukidnon, in the Philippines.

== Location ==
It is bounded to the north by Cabangahan, to the east by the Sawaga River which separates it from Simaya and Santo Niño, to the south by the Manupali River which separates it from Colonia and Mailag of Valencia City, and to the west by Kulasihan of the municipality of Lantapan. According to the 2015 census, Bangcud has a population of 5,111 people. It has an area of 1,575 hectares (15.75 km^{2}), subdivided into seven purok. Bangcud is mostly flat and is surrounded by three rivers, the Kulasihan, Manupali, and Sawaga, where the confluence of the latter two marks Bangcud's southernmost point.

== Economy ==
Agriculture is the primary economic activity; sugarcane, maize, and rice are among the primary crops produced. There is also a sizable commercial activity as Bangcud is situated on the crossroads to Malaybalay City proper, Basakan District, and Valencia City. Bangcud is known for its two foremost tourist attractions, the Matin-ao and Nasulî Springs. These are natural springs popular for their cool and clear waters, which appear blue in deeper parts. Bangcud Central School and Bangcud National High School are the main public schools in the barangay, both of which are within District VII.

== History ==
Bangcud comes from the Cebuano word "bangkò" which means chair, referring to a boulder along the Manupali that resembles a chair. The village was then incorporated as a sitio of Mailag. In 1935, Bangcud was separated from Mailag as a regular barrio and remained as part of Malaybalay when Mailag was separated from Malaybalay to form the municipality of Valencia in 1959.
