= Monastery of the Transfiguration (Bukidnon) =

Roman Catholic monastery in Bukidnon, Philippines

- The Transfiguration Church in 2023

Religion
- Affiliation: Roman Catholic
- Province: Cagayan de Oro (Note: Ecclesiastical province; under the Archdiocese of Cagayan de Oro)
- Status: Monastery complex with church

Location
- Location: San Jose, Malaybalay, Bukidnon
- Country: Philippines
- Interactive map of Monastery of the Transfiguration
- Administration: Order of Saint Benedict
- Coordinates: 8°06′53.4″N 125°08′09.0″E

Architecture
- Architect: Leandro Locsin (church)
- Established: 1983 (monastery)
- Completed: 1996 (church)

The Monastery of the Transfiguration, also known as the Abbey of the Transfiguration, is a Roman Catholic monastery complex in Malaybalay, Bukidnon, Philippines, run by the Benedictine Order. The monastery was established in 1983.

== Description ==
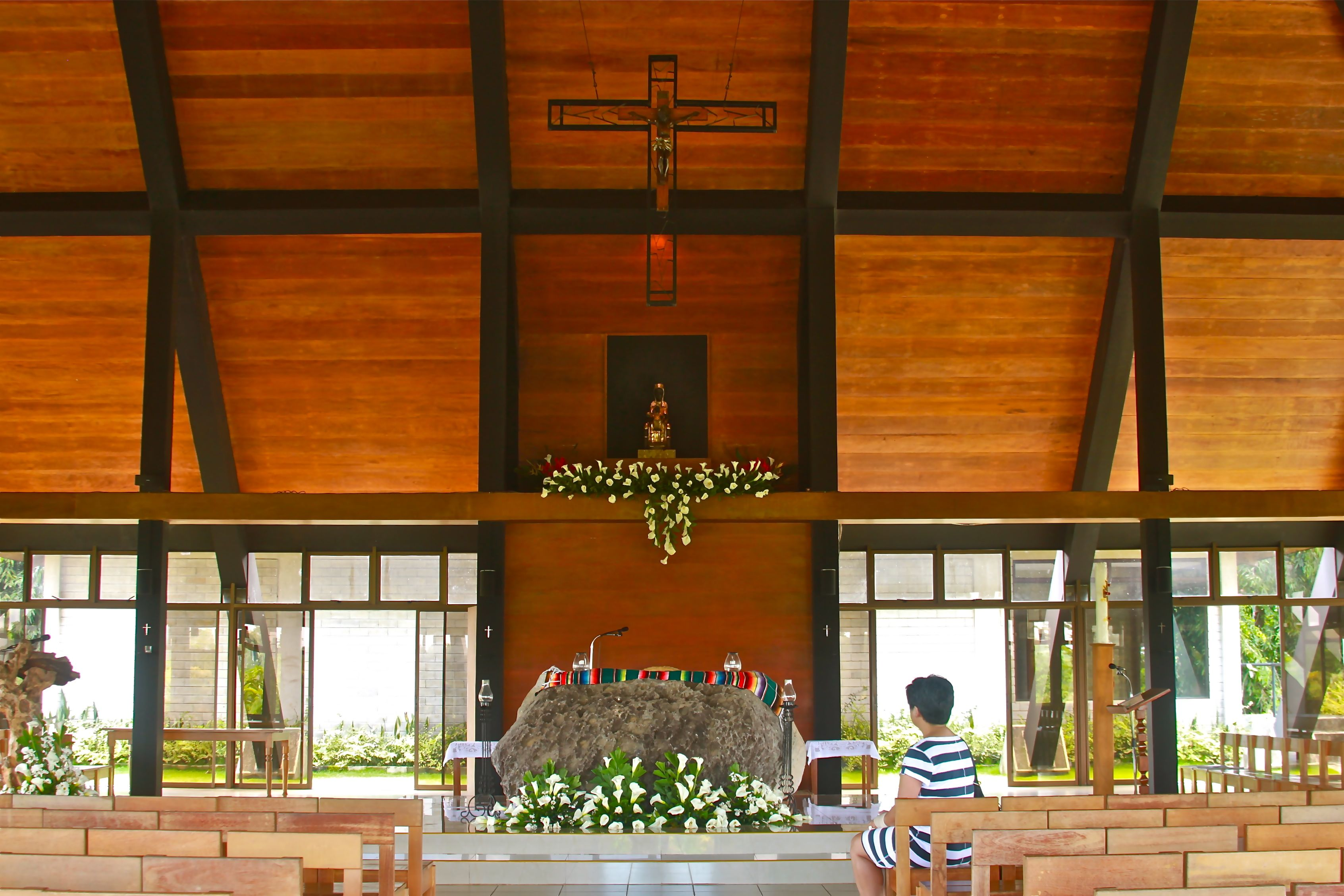
Church altar, with a replica of the Virgin of Montserrat

Established in 1983, the abbey is noted for its pyramidal Transfiguration Church, designed by National Artist Leandro Locsin. Inspired by Ifugao nipa huts, the church was inaugurated on August 6, 1996. Prior to the construction of Locsin's pyramid, the monastery existed in three smaller pyramidal buildings around a small courtyard. These were designed by architect Cecilio Maceren and inaugurated on 6 August 1983. Maceren's pyramids represent the three tents Saint Peter mentioned in the Transfiguration of Jesus, thus the inaugurations of both sites on 6 August, the Feast of the Transfiguration.

The main altar is from a volcanic boulder sourced from close to the abbey. It also has a two-storey museum, which exhibits the liturgical vestments collection of resident monk Dom Martín de Jesús Gómez, OSB, (Note: Known as Gang Gomez in his secular life as a fashion designer; born Edgardo Ramón Hizon Gómez) formerly a couturier in the 1970s and 1980s whose clientele included First Lady Imelda Marcos. It opened on August 6, 2008.

The monastery also has a 15-room retreat/guest house, serving meals and allowing visitors to attend liturgies with the monks. The monks also produce and sell their own brand of coffee, "Monks Blend", available in their gift shop and Abbey Cafe, alongside other foodstuffs and religious souvenirs.
