= Valencia, Bukidnon =

Component city in Bukidnon, Philippines

Valencia
- Component city
- City of Valencia
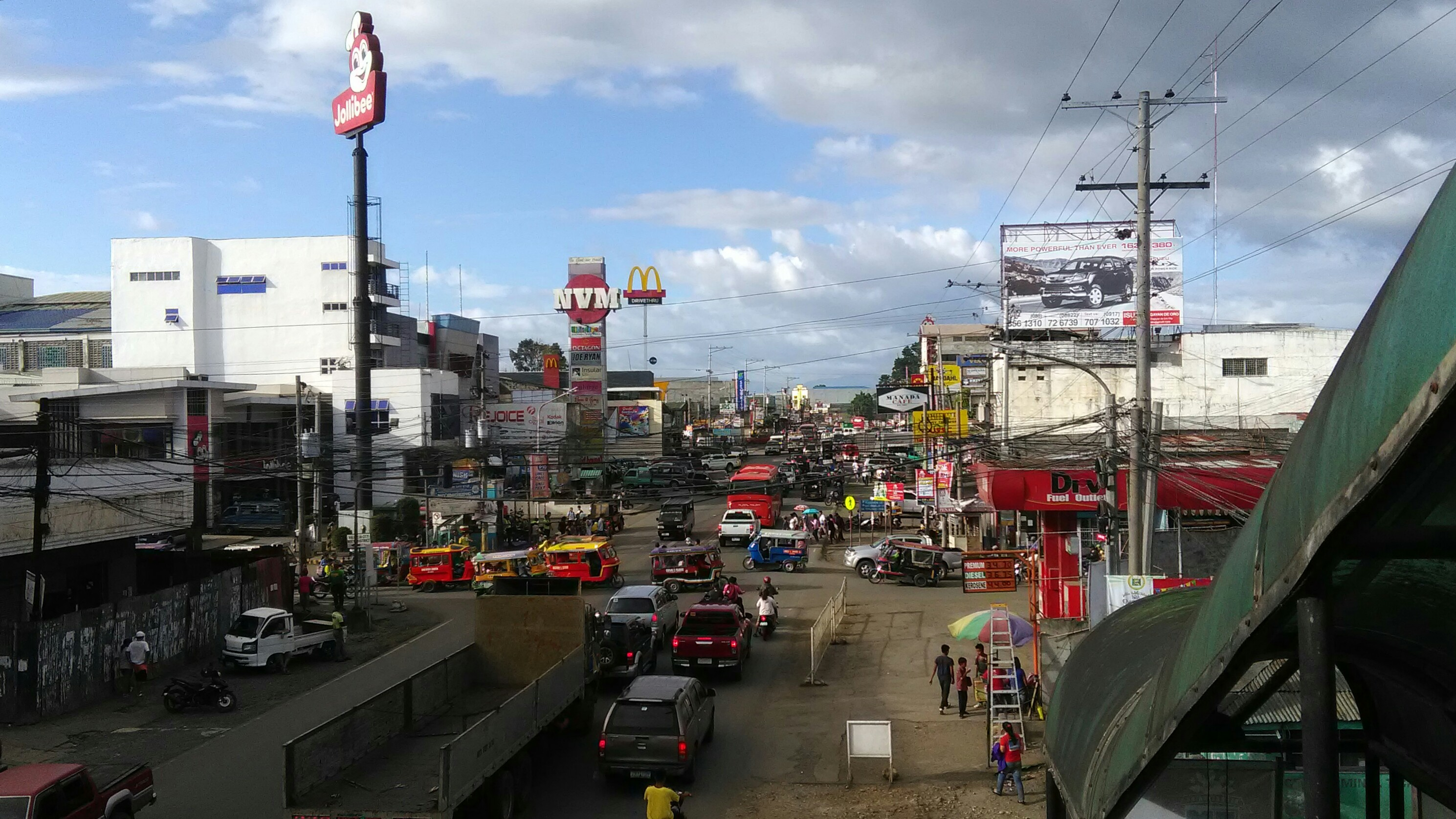
- Valencia City skyline at G. Laviña Avenue- Sayre Highway Intersection

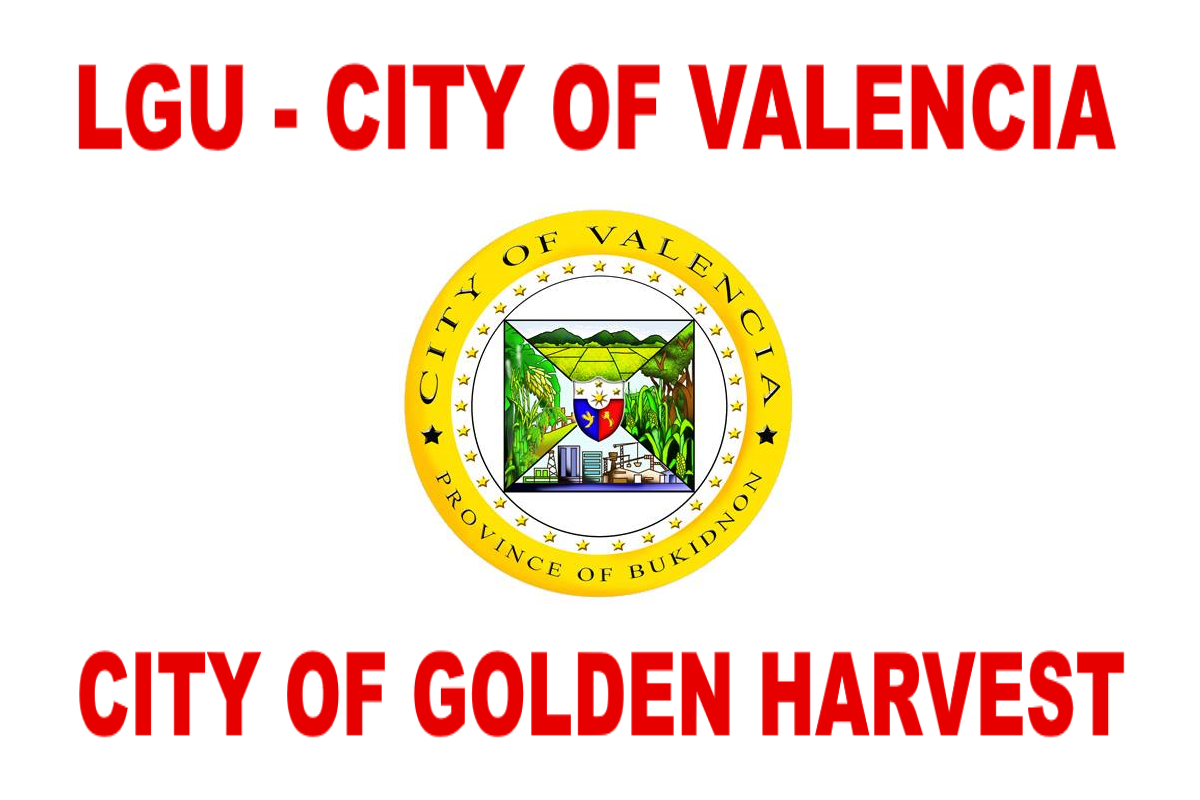
- Flag Seal Wordmark
- Nickname: City of Golden Harvest
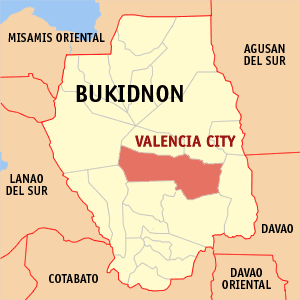
- Map of Bukidnon with Valencia highlighted
- Interactive map of Valencia
- Location within the Philippines
- Coordinates: 7°54′15″N 125°05′34″E
- Country: Philippines
- Region: Northern Mindanao
- Province: Bukidnon
- District: 4th district
- Founded: October 11, 1959
- Cityhood: January 12, 2001
- Barangays: 31 (see Barangays)

Government
  - Type: Sangguniang Panlungsod
  - Mayor: Amie G. Galario
  - Vice Mayor: Grezil "Cecil" G. Galario-Fernandez
  - Representative: Laarni L. Roque
  - City Council: Members: Karen M. Gamolo; Annalou Q. Zambrano; Alfredo P. Laviña; Jerusha Cadigal-Recla; Cecile Mabao-Caballero; Mark Anthonee T. Bernal; Mauricio S. Sistoso, Jr.; Rolando D. Centillas, Jr.; Rogelio P. Hera; Ryan Jay J. Rosal; Lito P. Palutao (ABC President); Bae Irene Pandian (IP Representative); Jairrah Mae A. Lazanas (SK President)
  - Electorate: 134,171 voters (2025)

Area
  - Total: 587.29 km^{2} (226.75 sq mi)
- Elevation: 634 m (2,080 ft)
- Highest elevation: 2,229 m (7,313 ft)
- Lowest elevation: 233 m (764 ft)

Population (2024 census)
  - Total: 223,620
  - Density: 380.77/km^{2} (986.18/sq mi)
  - Households: 52,184
- Demonym(s): Valenciano (masculine); Valenciana (feminine)

Economy
  - Income class: 1st city income class
  - Poverty incidence: 20.77% (2023)
  - Revenue: ₱ 1,991 million (2024)
  - Assets: ₱ 4,446 million (2024)
  - Expenditure: ₱ 1,779 million (2024)
  - Liabilities: ₱ 1,559 million (2024)

Service provider
  - Electricity: First Bukidnon Electric Cooperative (FIBECO)
  - Water: Valencia City Water District (VCWD)
- Time zone: UTC+8 (PST)
- ZIP code: 8709
- PSGC: 101321000
- IDD : area code: +63 (0)88
- Native languages: Cebuano
- Major religions: Roman Catholicism, Christianity, Islam
- Feast date: August 28
- Catholic diocese: Roman Catholic Diocese of Malaybalay
- Patron saint: Augustine of Hippo
- Website: cityofvalencia.gov.ph

Valencia, officially the City of Valencia, (Note: Cebuano: Dakbayan sa Valencia; Filipino: Lungsod ng Valencia; Hiligaynon: Dakbanwa sang Valencia; Bukid and Higaonon: Ciudad ta Valencia; Kapampangan: Ciudad/Lakanbalen ning Valencia; Ilocano: Siudad ti Valencia; Central Bikol: Siyudad kan Valencia; Waray: Syudad han Valencia.) (Note: Czech: Město z Valencie; Ukrainian: Місто Валенсія; Spanish: Ciudad de Valencia; Italian: Città di Valencia; Romanian: Orașul Valencia.) is a component city in the province of Bukidnon, Philippines. According to the 2024 census, it has a population of 223,620 people.

The city is the most populous among all cities and municipalities in Bukidnon, and the 6th largest in terms of land area in the province. It is also the most populous inland/landlocked city in Mindanao. It is the third largest city in Northern Mindanao in terms of population, after Cagayan de Oro and Iligan respectively.

The city serves as the center of trade and commerce in the province of Bukidnon.

== History ==
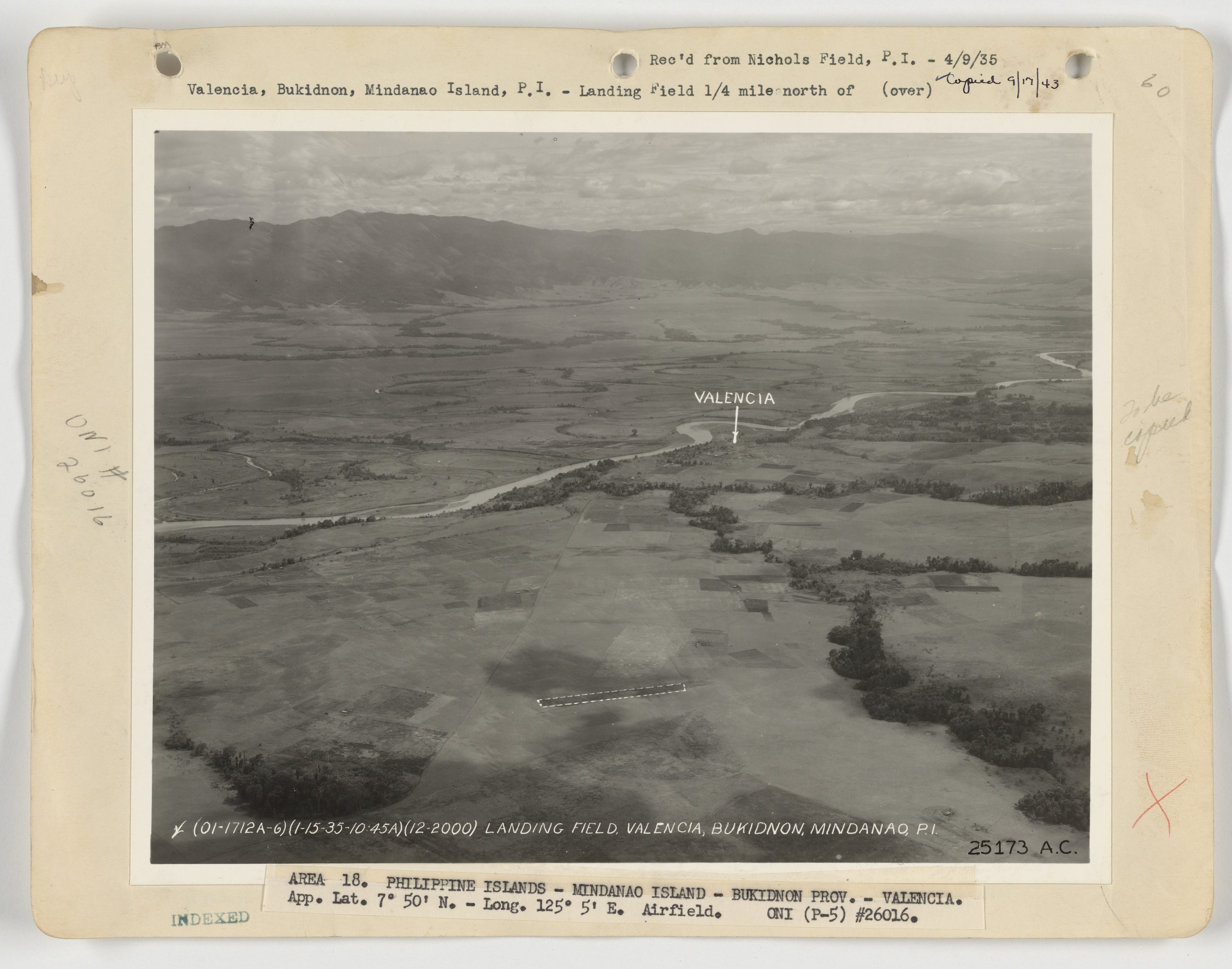
Aerial view of Valencia, 1935

=== Origins ===
The territory that now comprises the city of Valencia was combined from thirteen barangays of Malaybalay.

The earliest inhabitants in the area, presently comprising part of the Poblacion, were Bukidnon natives who founded a settlement along the banks of Pulangi River and the confluence of the Dumanggas River. The pioneers were led by Darwin Dumanggas Manangkila together with the families of the Binalhays, Laugas, Dongogans, Gua-ans, Lanayans, and the Arenzos. The first site of the settlement was a sitio named "Panglibatuhan" because the area was thickly forested by tree species called by the natives as "Malibato trees".

In 1911, a one-room barrio school was opened, and its first teacher was Leon Galorport. The school site is approximately the present location of the Poblacion Barangay High School. Galorport, who came from Valencia, Bohol, named the school "Valencia School" after his hometown. When the sitio became a barrio of Malaybalay, the residents agreed to name it "Valencia". Finally, when the southern portion of Malaybalay was separated as a new municipality, the petitioners agreed to name the municipality as "Valencia". However, the use of the name "Valencia" is already seen in Spanish documents in 1893 or even earlier which places it under the jurisdiction of Linabo or Sevilla (now Mailag) in the Province of Misamis.

The rich natural resources found in the territory eventually attracted Christian settlers from the highly populated coastal areas of Mindanao, Visayas and Luzon islands.

=== Political birth ===
Teodoro Pepito led a petition by residents to convert barrio Valencia into a full-fledged municipality. The petition was forwarded to the Provincial Board of the Bukidnon province for consideration. The Provincial Board passed a resolution approving the creation of the Municipality of Valencia, which it forwarded to the Office of the President of the Philippines.

By virtue of the provisions of Executive Order No. 360, the municipality of Valencia was formally born on October 11, 1959. The barrios of Bagontaas, Cawayanon, Guinoyuran, Laligan, Lilingayon, Lumbayao, Lurugan, Maapag, Mailag, San Isidro, Sugod, Tongantongan, and Valencia, together with their respective sittios, were separated from then Malaybalay to form the Municipality of Valencia. Later, some sitios of the original barrios became regular barangays, resulting to the present 31 barangays of Valencia.

On August 10, 1960, Teodoro N. Pepito and Ernesto Garcia were appointed by President Carlos P. Garcia as mayor and vice-mayor of the municipality, respectively. On May 19, 1961, Pepito's and Garcia's appointments were extended by President Garcia. Upon the election of Diosdado Macapagal in November 1961, President Garcia's appointees were recalled; President Macapagal appointed Lucilo Alkuino as the new ad interim mayor and Solomon Gao-ay as the new ad interim vice-mayor. These appointments were extended by Macapagal on June 6, 1962, and lasted until the first general elections were held in 1963. Thus, between 1962 and 1963, two sets of municipal officials have served the municipality of Valencia—albeit one set was acting in a de facto capacity. The controversy between the two different appointments was brought to court and later, eventually reached the Supreme Court. In a decision dated May 31, 1965, two years after the first general election was held, the said high court declared, in a quo warranto petition, that Pepito's and Garcia's tenure after Macapagal's appointment were not legally recognized.

During the regular local election in November 1963, Pepito won and became the first elected mayor, with Ernesto Garcia as the vice mayor. Pepito was re-elected in 1967 and again in 1971. However, before his term expired in 1975, martial law was declared by President Ferdinand Marcos in 1972 and elections for local officials were suspended. Pepito continued to hold office as mayor until 1978, when he retired from government service. The vice mayor, Absalon Catarata, succeeded as mayor until 1979, when President Ferdinand Marcos appointed Santiago Dablio as acting mayor.

In 1980 local elections, Absalon Catarata was elected mayor, with Romulo Makalood as vice mayor together with all the councilors in the opposition ticket. In February 1986, the People Power Revolution in Manila took place and Corazon Aquino became the President of the Republic.

During the campaign for the approval of the new constitution, the municipal government under the leadership of Absalon Catarata wholeheartedly supported it. In January 1988, Catarata was re-elected as mayor and his running mate, Berthobal Ancheta was elected as vice mayor together with seven councilors under his party. Months later, he was elected president of the Bukidnon Mayors League and similarly as president of the Mayor's League of Region X.

On the evening of April 21, 1988, Catarata was fatally shot by an unknown assassin in front of his residence while waiting for his service vehicle which would have fetched him to an evening program at the town plaza. After his death, Vice Mayor Berthobal Ancheta became the municipal mayor, and Afrodisia Catarata, the wife of then Mayor, was appointed member of the Sangguniang Bayan. In the synchronized elections of 1990, Ancheta was re-elected while Afrodisia Catarata was elected as vice mayor up to June 2001.

=== Cityhood ===
By virtue of Republic No. Act 8985, the Municipality of Valencia was converted into a component city known as the City of Valencia on act converting the municipality of Valencia on January 12, 2001. In 2001 elections, Jose Galario Jr., the former Chief of Police of the city, was elected as City Mayor; while Leandro Jose Catarata, the son of Absalon and Afrodisia Catarata was also elected as the city's vice mayor. During the 2004 local elections, both the incumbent mayor and vice mayor ran for the position of city mayor. Galario emerged as the winning candidate together with Benjamin Verano as vice mayor.

In the 2007 elections, Galario lost to his rival, Leandro Jose Catarata for city mayor. Benjamin Verano was re-elected as vice mayor of the city. In the 2010 general elections, Catarata was reelected for a second term; while Benjamin Verano Sr., Catarata's running mate, won the vice mayoralty position. However early in 2010, Verano died at office and was replaced by Azucena Huervas, the president of Valencia's Association of Barangay Captains.

On June 9, 2014, Vice Mayor Huervas assumed the mayorship of the city after the conviction of Mayor Galario for violating the Anti-graft and Corrupt practices Act (RA 3019) in relation to his order transferring Ruth P. Piano from Budget Office to a non-existing office of City Liaison Officer.

On the May 9, 2016 elections, Huervas defeated her rivals, Amie G. Galario, Renato Centillas, and Leandro Jose H. Catarata. She was also re-elected in the 2019 elections along with her runningmate Policarpo P. Murillo IV as Vice-Mayor.

== Geography ==
Valencia is located in the central part of the Province of Bukidnon. It is bounded on the north by the municipality of Lantapan and Malaybalay; on the east by the municipality of San Fernando; on the west and southwest by the municipalities of Pangantucan and Talakag; and on the south by the municipalities of Maramag and Quezon.

From its core, which is the Poblacion, the city is 27 kilometers from the provincial capital of Malaybalay and 118 kilometers from the regional center of Cagayan de Oro. The means of transportation is by bus and private vehicles and covers approximately two to three hours ride.

The relative distance of the barangay from the city proper varies: four barangays are more or less 5 kilometers away, 20 barangays are 6 to 15 kilometers away, while the remaining seven barangays considered as the most interior, are situated 16 kilometers or more from the city proper.

The nearest airports and seaports are in Cagayan de Oro and Davao City.

=== Topography ===
The city's topography is characterized as flat to undulating hills with extensive plateaus and mountainous areas and cliffs on both eastern and western portions bounding the municipality of San Fernando on the east and the municipality of Talakag on the west. Its highest point is Mount Kalatungan in the Kalatungan Mountain Range rising above 1,000 meters and above 50 percent slopes. These cover 25.72 percent of the total city area and major portions of Barangay of Lourdes, Guinoyuran and Lilingayon.

=== Elevation ===
The city's average elevation is 300 meters above sea level. Elevation above 1,000 meters has a bigger area coverage with 28.93 percent of the total city area or 18,262.79 hectares, while elevation below 300 meters covers only 7.0 percent of total city area or 4,419.78 hectares. Elevation ranges from 300 to 500 meters cover an area of 27,591.10 hectares or 43.70 percent of the total city area. Five hundred to 1,000 meter elevation covers an area of 18,262.79 hectares or 28.93 percent of total city area.

=== Slope ===
The area distribution of slope of the city are categorized into: level to gently sloping having a slope range of 0-3 percent covering an area of 6,962.53 hectares or 11.02 percent of the total city area; gently sloping to undulating having a slope range of 3-8 percent covering an area of 18,914.79 hectares or 29.96 percent of total city area; undulating to rolling having a slope range of 8-18 percent covering an area of 3,646.33 hectares or 5.78 percent of the total city area; rolling to hilly having a slope range of 18-30 percent with an area coverage of 11,306.28 hectares or 17.92 percent of the total city area; steep hills to mountainous having a slope of 30-50 percent with area coverage of 6,062.53 hectares or 9.60 percent of the total City area and; cliff-like streamline having a slope range of 50 percent above covering an area of 16,233.54 hectares or 25.72 percent of the total area.

=== Geology and soil type ===
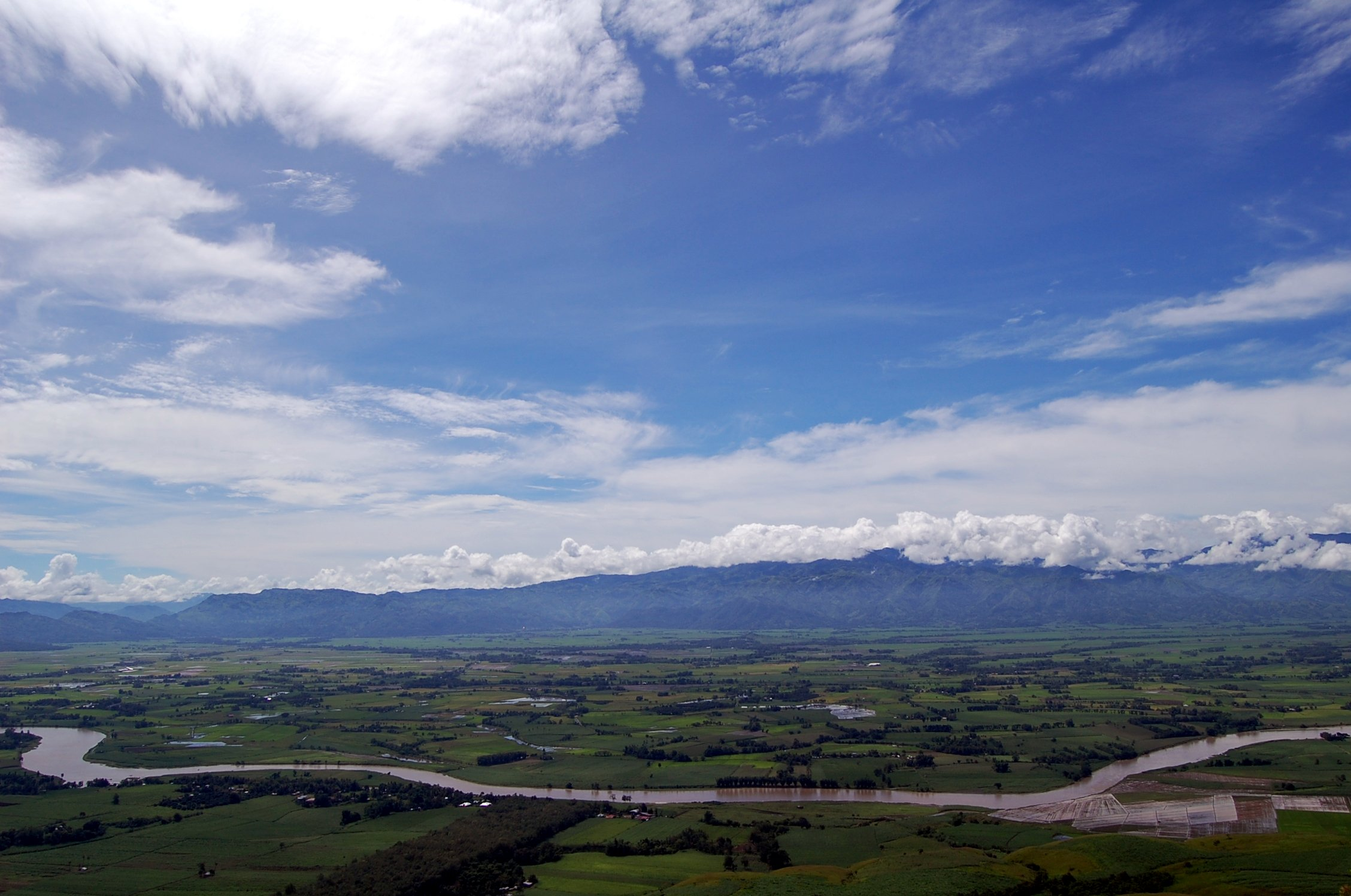
Pulangi River traversing Valencia City, Bukidnon.

Valencia City is underlain by three distinct geologic formations. Volcanic rocks believed to be of pliocene-quaternary age underlie the areas west of Pulangi River. The areas east of the broad plains in Valencia City are underlain by stratified sequence of clastic sedimentary rocks and limestone. Alluvial deposits are unconsolidated detrital materials transformed from higher landforms.

The city generally has clay soil with Adtuyon clay covering 27.89 percent of the total city area suitable for annual cultivated crops and pastures. These are found in all parts of Colonia, Mailag, Bagontaas, Barobo and San Carlos. Maapag clay ranked second with 26.86 percent and covers the whole of San Isidro, Sinayawan, Mabuhay, and Catumbalon and large portions of Vintar, Tongantongan, Maapag and Batangan. Irrigated rice is suitable in these areas. Macolod clay ranked third with 17.51 percent and are generally suited for forest plantation of exotic species. Kidapawan clay loam and undifferentiated mountains soil followed and occupy a combined area of 17.70 percent located within Lilingayon. These areas are also suitable for production forest of native species. Other soil types are San Manuel clay loam (5.31%), La Castellana clay (3.41%), Adtuyon clay stony phase (0.83%), and Mailag clay loam. These types of soil are suitable for annual cultivated crops except for the cliffs along Pulangi River within Poblacion and Lumbo which are not suitable for any land use.

=== Climate ===
Climate data for Valencia City, Bukidnon
Month	Jan	Feb	Mar	Apr	May	Jun	Jul	Aug	Sep	Oct	Nov	Dec	Year
Mean daily maximum °C (°F)	28 (82)	28 (82)	29 (84)	30 (86)	30 (86)	29 (84)	29 (84)	29 (84)	29 (84)	29 (84)	29 (84)	28 (82)	29 (84)
Mean daily minimum °C (°F)	21 (70)	21 (70)	21 (70)	22 (72)	23 (73)	23 (73)	23 (73)	23 (73)	23 (73)	23 (73)	22 (72)	22 (72)	22 (72)
Average precipitation mm (inches)	118 (4.6)	73 (2.9)	66 (2.6)	74 (2.9)	175 (6.9)	261 (10.3)	271 (10.7)	281 (11.1)	267 (10.5)	258 (10.2)	164 (6.5)	93 (3.7)	2,101 (82.9)
Average rainy days	16.0	13.8	12.4	13.1	24.2	27.6	28.9	28.5	27.1	27.4	21.0	16.1	256.1
Source: PAGASA

=== Barangays ===
Valencia City is politically subdivided into 31 barangays. Each barangay consists of puroks while some have sitios. Lilingayon is the largest with an area of 131.42 square kilometers while Colonia is the smallest at 4.95 square kilometers.

Barangay	Type	Population (2015)	Population (2020)	Area (km^{2})	Population density per km^{2}
Bagontaas	Urban	10,619	12,772 ▲	9.75	1,309.94
Banlag	Urban	7,099	8,220 ▲	50.43	162.99
Barobo	Rural	4,123	4,117 ▼	18.81	218.87
Batangan	Urban	11,550	14,276 ▲	16.74	852.80
Catumbalon	Rural	2,291	2,456 ▲	5.40	454.81
Colonia	Rural	3,065	3,260 ▲	4.95	658.58
Concepcion	Urban	4,193	5,234 ▲	26.98	193.99
Dagat-kidavao	Urban	5,164	5,510 ▲	31.25	176.32
Guinoyuran	Urban	6,347	7,268 ▲	32.05	226.77
Kahaponan	Urban	6,400	6,604 ▲	13.64	484.16
Laligan	Urban	7,003	6,616 ▼	19.16	345.30
Lilingayon	Urban	6,736	7,216 ▲	131.42	54.90
Lourdes	Rural	1,870	1,955 ▲	9.88	197.87
Lumbayao	Rural	3,364	3,872 ▲	12.32	314.28
Lumbo	Urban	16,082	18,229 ▲	27.22	669.69
Lurugan	Rural	8,078	9,402 ▲	42.05	223.59
Maapag	Rural	1,650	1,914 ▲	4.99	388.56
Mabuhay	Rural	3,723	3,997 ▲	11.76	339.88
Mailag	Urban	6,805	7,700 ▲	9.35	823.52
Mt.Nebo	Urban	3,069	3,182 ▲	13.97	227.77
Nabag-o	Rural	2,225	2,567 ▲	10.69	240.13
Pinatilan	Rural	3,613	3,641 ▲	7.06	515.72
Poblacion	Urban	35,793	40,350 ▲	14.54	2,775.10
San Carlos	Rural	3,959	4,878 ▲	19.71	247.48
San Isidro	Rural	2,767	2,481 ▼	5.04	492.26
Sinabuagan	Rural	2,121	2,276 ▲	11.17	203.76
Sinayawan	Urban	7,006	7,990 ▲	18.91	422.52
Sugod	Rural	4,306	5,782 ▲	7.63	757.79
Tongantongan	Rural	7,450	7,577 ▲	20.26	373.98
Tugaya	Rural	2,556	2,663 ▲	18.75	142.02
Vintar	Rural	1,966	2,541 ▲	5.38	472.30
Total		192,993	216,543 ▲	587.29 km^{2}	368.71/km^{2}

=== Poblacion and adjacent areas ===
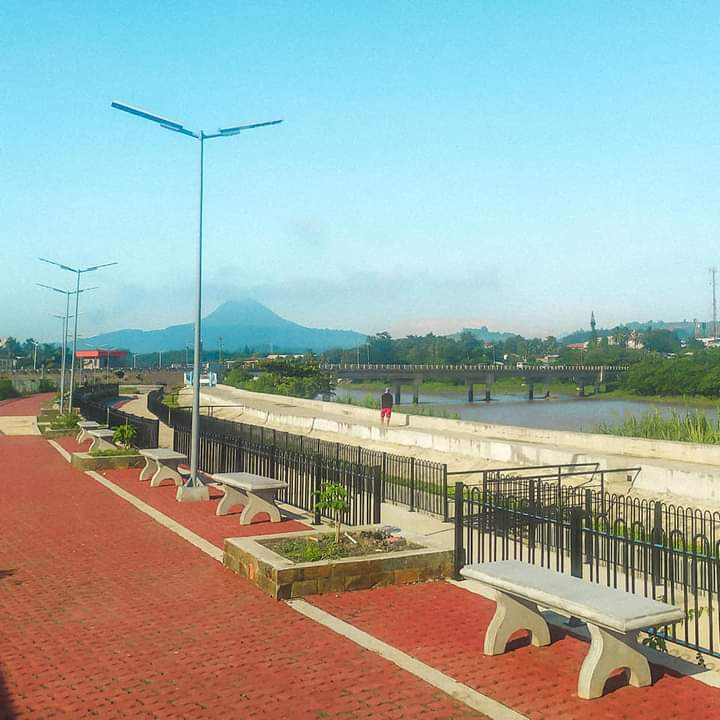
The Pulangi Riverside Boulevard

Poblacion and its surroundings hold importance in the city, serving as the venue of everyday life in and near the urban center. Due to its large urban population and area, there are informal and unofficial sectors which hold cultural, social, and economic significance to the city. These areas are also referred for transportation means when riding within and from the Poblacion. Some of the sectors/areas in the urban center include:

- Balite – a concentration of residences at the northern part of the Poblacion. Named after the large tree that once stood there.
- Barok – located on the western end of Laviña Ave. Valencia City Farmer's Market, several commercial establishment and residential areas are found here.
- Cabanuangan – areas on the upper part of Poblacion, dominated by sugarcane fields and some residences.
- Centro – the business center of the city from the core area of the Poblacion extending up to the boundary of Barangay Poblacion to the south stretching Sayre Highway.
- Hagkol – a commercial-residential area north of Poblacion stretching the Sayre Highway. Several food stores and shops, tertiary schools, auto shops and stores, hotels, residential villages, and fuel stations are found at Hagkol.
- Hindangon – area on the northwestern part of Poblacion after Juanilla Village along Hagkol. Areas are mostly residential and diversified agricultural fields.
- Kawayanon – an urban sitio in the lower part of Barangay Lumbo bounding Barangay Poblacion.
- La-uyan – residential area in the western bank of Pulangi river near the Panlibatuhan creek.
- Malingon, Bagontaas – currently the northernmost urban expansion of the city which is part of Barangay Bagontaas. Some commercial establishments, schools, a village, Toyota Valencia, Valencia Integrated Transport Terminal Complex, and the future Robinsons Place Valencia are located in the said area.
- Petisyon – a rural hill in the westernmost side of Poblacion.
- Santa Cruz – upper portion of the Poblacion along Guinoyuran road near the boundary of Brgys. Barobo and Poblacion. Sparse residences and agricultural fields and a chapel is present in the area.
- Slaughter – concentration of residences on the southern slope and lower areas of a hill where the City Hall is located. Named after the Abattoir or "Slaughter House" which is located in the area.
- Tabuk-Tulay – literally means "to cross the bridge", after vehicles passing eastside the Pulangi or Batangan Bridges from the Poblacion. This term also colloquially include most parts of Batangan. Fuel stations, residential villages, auto shops, several commercial stand and rice mills are found in the area.
- Upper Lumbo (Centro Lumbo) – comprising the residential areas and villages in the upper portion of Barangay Lumbo.
- Upland – concentration of residences south of Centro covering some parts of Purok 3 and Purok 3-B of Poblacion.

Other places in the urban area of the city are referred by their building/establishment names, streets, and Purok.

== Demographics ==
Population census of Valencia
Year	Pop.	±% p.a.
1960	13,898	—
1970	39,708	+11.06%
1975	64,541	+10.23%
1980	81,835	+4.86%
1990	116,110	+3.56%
1995	128,623	+1.94%
2000	147,924	+3.04%
2007	162,745	+1.33%
2010	181,556	+4.06%
2015	192,993	+1.17%
2020	216,546	+2.45%
2024	223,620	+0.77%
Source: Philippine Statistics Authority

According to the 2020 census, it has a population of 216,546 people, with a density of 370 inhabitants per square kilometre or 960 inhabitants per square mile. In addition, Valencia's Barangay Poblacion is the largest barangay in the province and third largest in the region according to population.

Immigration of Christian settlers to the area started in the middle 1930s. During the Second World War, the continued migration of Christian settlers further increased the population of the area from 13,898 in 1960 to 64,541 in 1975. The population grew to 181,556 in 2010.

=== Religion ===
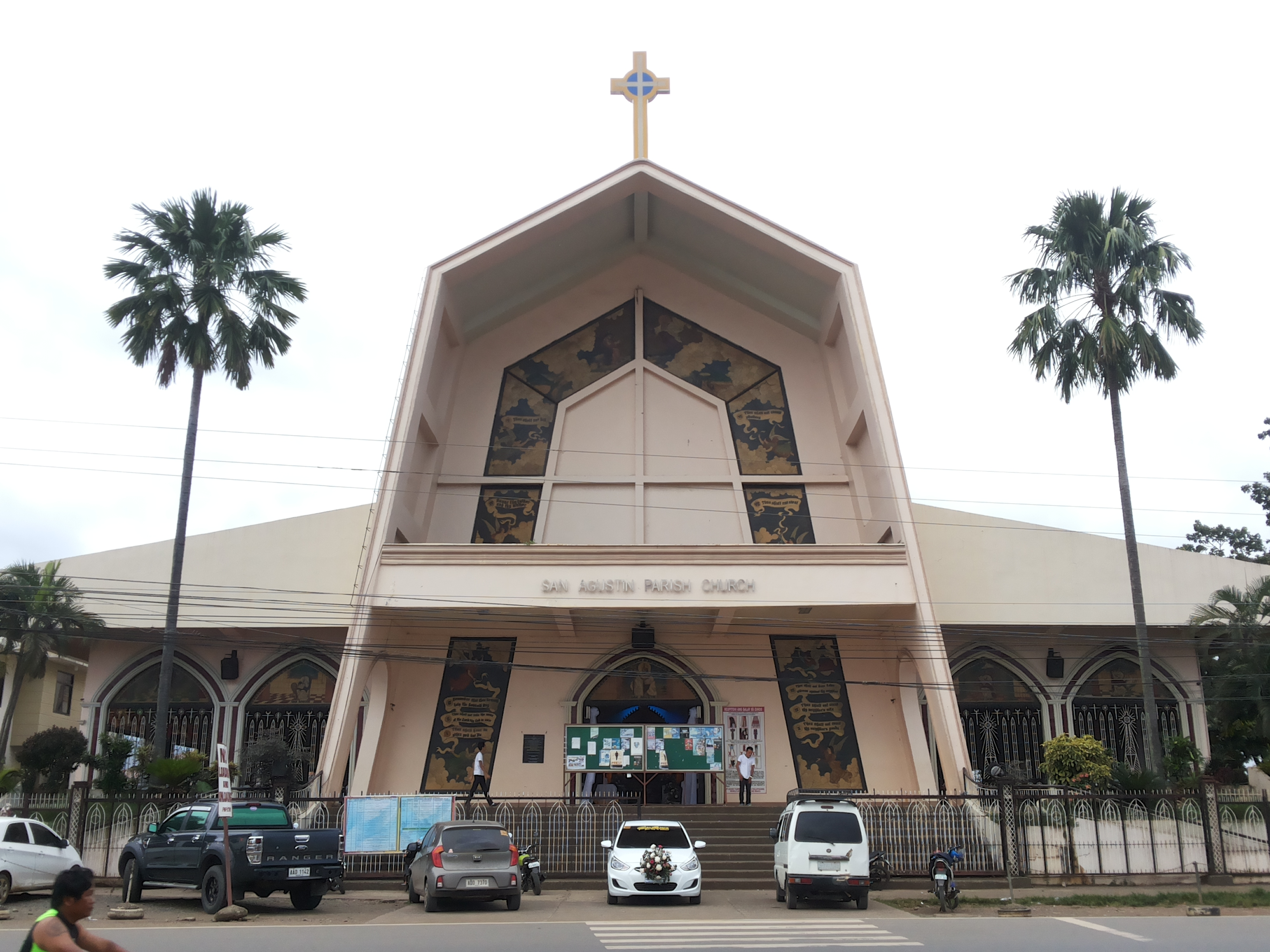
San Agustin Parish Church

The city has several sects, namely: Seventh-Day Adventist Church, Church of Christ of Latter-Day Saints, Jehovah's Witnesses, Iglesia Ni Cristo, United Church of Christ in the Philippines, Iglesia sa Dios Espiritu Santo, United Methodist Church, several Baptist and Pentecostal congregations, and many others. Valencia also has 5 Islamic mosques around the city.

There are eight Roman Catholic Parishes in the city:

Parish	Church Location
San Agustin Parish	Sayre Highway, Poblacion, Valencia City
Mother of Good Counsel Parish	Barangay Mailag, Valencia City
San Jose Parish	Barangay Laligan, Valencia City
San Jose Parish	Barangay Sinayawan, Valencia City
Immaculate Conception Parish	Barangay Guinoyuran, Valencia City
San Isidro Parish	Barangay San Isidro, Valencia City
Our Mother of Perpetual Help Parish	Sayre Highway, Barangay Bagontaas, Valencia City
Saint Bernadette Parish	Barangay Batangan, Valencia City

The parishes are under the pastoral administration of Roman Catholic Diocese of Malaybalay.

== Economy ==
Poverty incidence of Valencia

Source: Philippine Statistics Authority

=== Commerce and trade ===
Valencia City is the center of trade and commerce in Bukidnon due to its central location in the heart of Mindanao and its rapid economic growth. The city is noted for its Valencia Rice, a variety of rice.

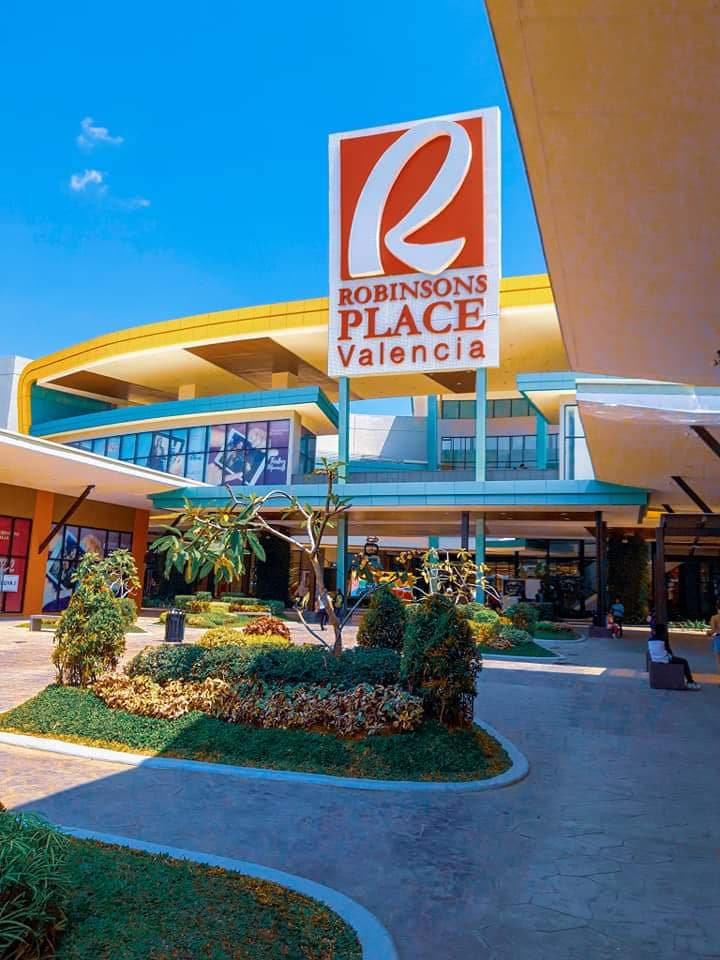
Robinsons Place Valencia

Some of the prominent retail stores in the city include Alkuino Emporium, Fiesta Shopping Center, Gaisano Valencia, NVM Mall, Puregold, Plaza Villahermosa, Roy Plaza, Robinsons Supermarket, Trendline, and Unitop. Soon-to-open include such stores as NVM Mall-Guinoyuran Road and Robinsons Place Valencia, the second Robinsons Place brand in Northern Mindanao after Iligan. Commercial establishments owned by Maranao, Chinese, and Korean immigrants are also found in the city.

The city has ample outlets for shopping. Commercial activities are centered on the Poblacion, particularly at the locally termed "Centro" (Downtown). Several retail stores, banks, and commercial establishments are located in this area of Poblacion. Aside from the Centro proper, there are some commercial establishments at Hagkol, on the north portion of Poblacion. It is a result of northward urban expansion of the city. Famous motorbike and vehicle retailers, hotels, schools, hospitals and cafes are located at the Hagkol area.

Valencia City has two functional public markets:

- Valencia City Public Market – located at the commercial center of the city, along G. Laviña Avenue. It serves as the central market of the population.
- Valencia Farmer's Market – it is found along Guinoyuran Road. Located in the upper part of Poblacion, it serves as the landing area of agricultural and aquatic products from neighboring towns and provinces. It is near to the proposed second branch of NVM Mall.

Of the 52 banks actively serving region of Bukidnon, 20 banks (about 40% of the province) are located in Valencia City. Nine of the ten largest universal/commercial banks in the country serve the city (except Unionbank). Other banks include Veterans Bank, One Network Bank, Asian United Bank, PSBank, Bukidnon Cooperative Bank, Enterprise Bank, Dumaguete City Development Bank, Rizal Microbank, EastWest Rural Bank, Bank of Makati, and Banco Dipolog.

In 2013, the city had a total generated income of PHP667,728,494. This has continued to surpass 600,000,000 in the following years.

=== Agriculture ===
The city has a total land area of 63,126 hectares. 35,321.74 hectares or 55.95% of this is the total agricultural area that is suitable for crop production. This illustrates that the city is agricultural-based; people depend on much of their source of income through farming, livestock, and poultry. Valencia is nicknamed as the City of Golden Harvest because of its vast rice plains along the barangays north and east of Pulangi River. Valencia's clay-rich, soil which is highly irrigated and favorable to climatic condition, is very conducive for crop production.

== Government ==
=== City administration ===
The city is executively administered by the mayor together with vice mayor. The legislative body comprises the members of the Sangguniang Panlungsod which serves as the city council. The mayor is the local chief executive officer of the city and exercises control and supervision over all local administrative offices; while the Sangguniang Panlungsod acts as the legislative body of the city as mandated by the Local Government Code of the Philippines.

=== List of mayors ===
No.	Name of mayor	Start of term	End of term	Vice-Mayor	Era
Appointive position (1961-1963)
1	Teodeoro N. Pepito^{1} (de facto capacity)	1960	1962	Ernesto Garcia	Municipality newly created
2	Lucilo Alkuino^{2} (de jure capacity)	1962	1963	Solomon Gao-ay	Municipality
Elective position (1963-1975)
(1)	Teodoro N. Pepito	1963	1967	Ernesto Garcia	Municipality
(1)	Teodoro N. Pepito	1967	1971		Municipality
(1)	Teodoro N. Pepito	1971	1975		Municipality
Martial law period
(1)	Teodoro N. Pepito (holdover capacity)	1975	September 1977		Municipality
3	Absalon P. Catarata^{3}	September 28, 1977	February 7, 1979		Municipality
4	Santiago V. Dablio^{4}	February 8, 1979	February 28, 1980		Municipality
(3)	Absalon P. Catarata	1980	1987	Romulo Makalood	Municipality
5	Filomeno B. Abitona, Jr. (officer-in-charge)	1987	1987		Municipality
6	Felino De Los Reyes	1987	1988		Municipality
Post-martial law period
(3)	Absalon P. Catarata	January 1988	April 21, 1988	Berthobal Ancheta	Municipality
7	Berthobal Ancheta	April 22, 1988	June 30, 1992	Afrodisia Catarata	Municipality
7	Berthobal Ancheta	June 30, 1992	June 30, 1995	Afrodisia Catarata	Municipality
7	Berthobal Ancheta	June 30, 1995	June 30, 1998	Afrodisia Catarata	Municipality
7	Berthobal Ancheta	June 30, 1998	June 30, 2001	Afrodisia Catarata	Municipality
Cityhood
8	Jose Galario Jr.	June 30, 2001	June 30, 2005	Leandro Jose Catarata	City
8	Jose Galario Jr.	June 30, 2005	June 30, 2007	Benjamin Verano, Sr.	City
9	Leandro Jose Catarata (Lakas-Kampi, 2010)	June 30, 2007	June 30, 2010	Benjamin Verano, Sr.	City
9	Leandro Jose Catarata (Lakas-Kampi, 2010)	June 30, 2010	June 30, 2013	Benjamin Verano, Sr.	City
9	Leandro Jose Catarata (Lakas-Kampi, 2010)	June 30, 2010	June 30, 2013	Azucena Huervas	City
(8)	Jose Galario Jr. (Aksyon Demokratiko)	June 30, 2013	June 8, 2014	Azucena Huervas	City
10	Azucena Huervas^{5} (Bukidnon Paglaum Party)	June 9, 2014	June 30, 2016	Rolando P. Laviña	City
10	Azucena Huervas^{5} (Bukidnon Paglaum Party)	June 30, 2016	June 30, 2019	Aboy Galario	City
10	Azucena Huervas^{5} (Bukidnon Paglaum Party)	June 30, 2019	June 30, 2022	Policarpio Murillo	City
10	Azucena Huervas^{5} (Bukidnon Paglaum Party)	June 30, 2022	June 30, 2025	Ted Pepito	City
11	Amie Galario (Independent); Incumbent	June 30, 2025	—	Cecil Galario-Fernandez	City

Notes

1. Teodoro N. Pepito was appointed by President Carlos P. Garcia in 1959 until 1961; continued occupying the mayoral seat from 1962 to 1963 in a de facto capacity. He was elected in 1964 and served for another two consecutive terms plus a hold over term due to Martial law.
2. Lucilo Alkuino was appointed by President Diosdado P. Macapagal in 1962.
3. Absalon P. Catarata succeeded the office upon Teodoro N. Pepito's retirement in 1977. He was elected for two consecutive terms in 1980 and 1988. Catarata died in office upon his assassination on April 21, 1988.
4. Santiago V. Dablio was appointed by President Ferdinand E. Marcos in 1979.
5. Azucena P. Huervas succeeded Galario's office after the latter was found guilty of violating the Anti-Graft and Corrupt Practices Act in June 2014.

== Tourism ==
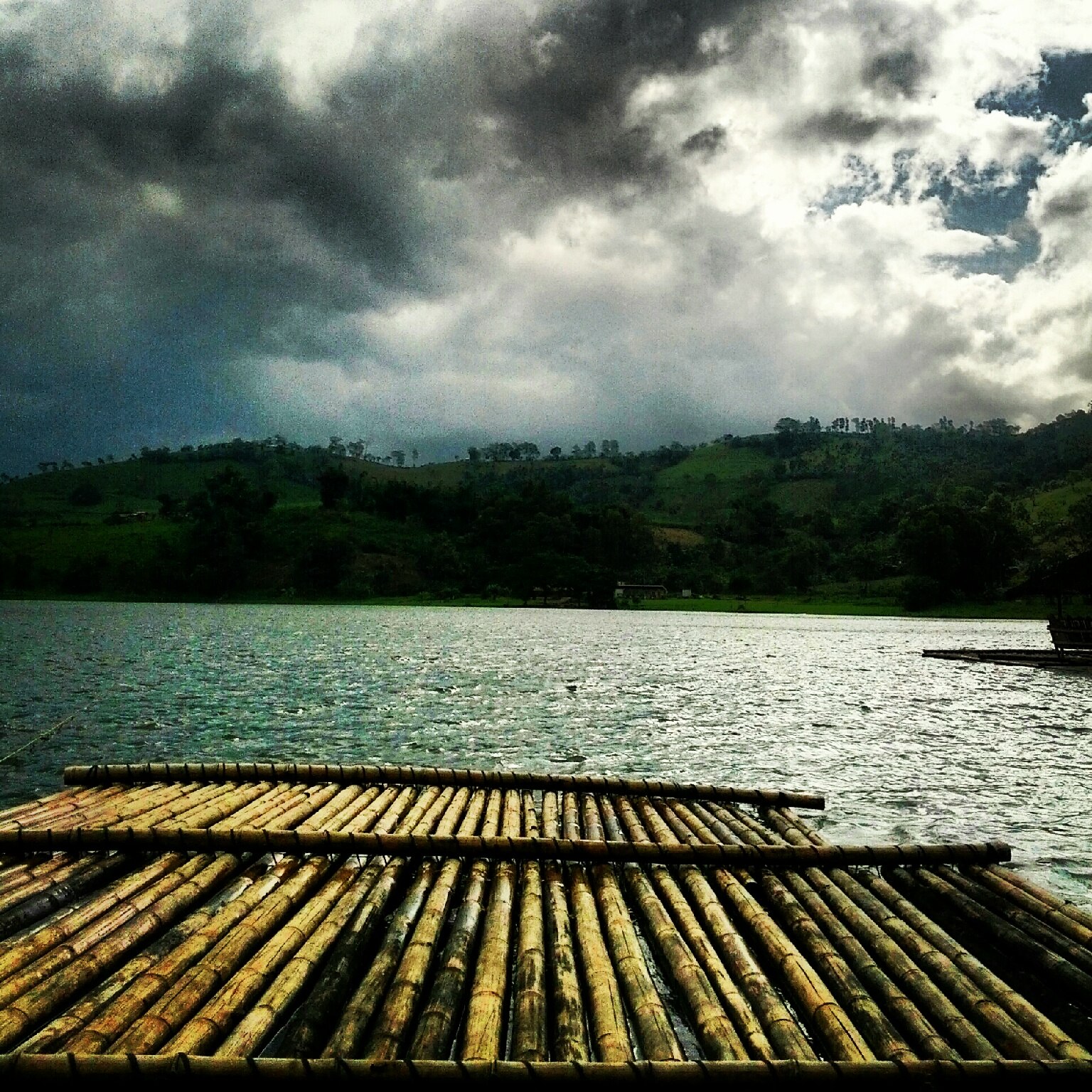
Lake Apo

Valencia has several tourist destinations and events as tourist attractions:

Lake Apo
Lake Apo is a crater lake in Barangay Guinoyoran. It is located in a hilly area about 640 metres (2,100 ft) in elevation, about 11 kilometres (6.8 mi) west southwest of the Barangay Poblacion, the city proper. Lake Apo was awarded the cleanest inland body of water in Northern Mindanao Region in the late 1990s. The green body of water has an estimated area of 24 hectares (59 acres) with maximum depths reaching up to 26 m (85 ft).

Kasanayan Cave
Kasanayan Cave is located six kilometers from Sitio San Vicente, Barangay Tongantongan. The cave has several huge stalactites and are found 400 meters deep from the cave's mouth. The cave also has a river inside it.

Waterfalls

- Malingon Falls in MVC, Mt Nebo
- Alamay Falls and Kimatahay Falls in Lilingayon.

=== Festivals and events ===
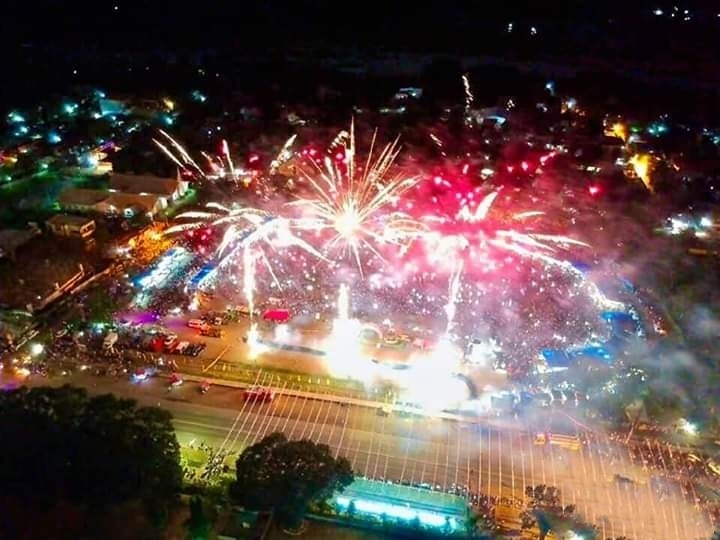
Golden Harvest Festival Charter Day in 2020

- The Valencia City Parochial Fiesta, organized by the San Agustin Parish, in collaboration with private sectors and Local Government Unit, is a Roman Catholic celebration of the feast of St. Augustine. It is celebrated every August 28, co-celebrating the feast day with Cagayan de Oro.
- The City Charter Day (Golden Harvest Festival) is a celebration commemorating the cityhood of Valencia. It is held annually every January 6 and is organized by the Local Government Unit of Valencia.
- The Panlalawaig Ta Pulangui Festival is the celebration of the waters of Pulangi River, through a fluvial parade. It is celebrated in honor of the people of Valencia, the river that nourishes the land, and the bamboo raft that strengthened the bond of the land to its people. The festival is a four-day affair that ends every second Saturday of January in celebration of its City Charter, homage to its founders and as a tribute to its hardworking people.

== Infrastructure ==
=== Transportation ===
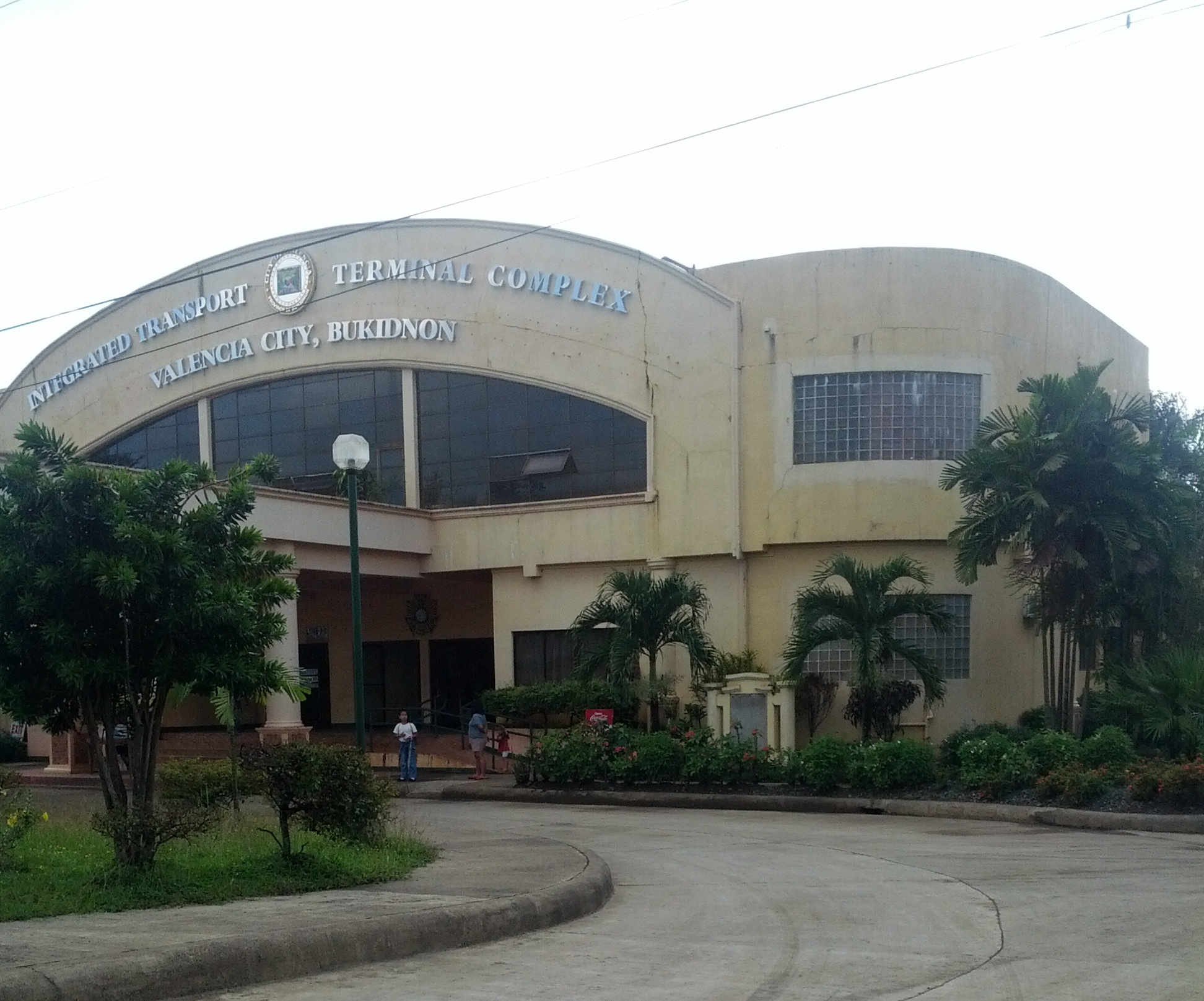
Valencia City's Integrated Transport Terminal Complex.

Valencia City is readily accessible by land. There are two functional transport terminals in the city.

Jeepneys from nearby municipalities and barangays, and single motorcycles are available at Valencia City Public Transport Terminal (Old Terminal), located at Poblacion. Public utility vehicles in the Old terminal are available for travel to the municipalities of Kadingilan, Kalilangan, Kibawe, Malaybalay City, Maramag, Quezon, San Fernando, and Wao.

Buses from Cagayan de Oro, and Davao City are housed in the Integrated Transportation Terminal Complex located at Barangay Bagontaas, approximately three kilometers north from Poblacion. Pabama Transport, and Super 5 serves the city with their regional routes. There are also numerous provincial buses serving the city.

Tricycles (locally Motorelas) and private vehicles facilitate the movement of people and goods to and from all places in the city. Traveling from Poblacion is mainly by land through all kinds of vehicles.

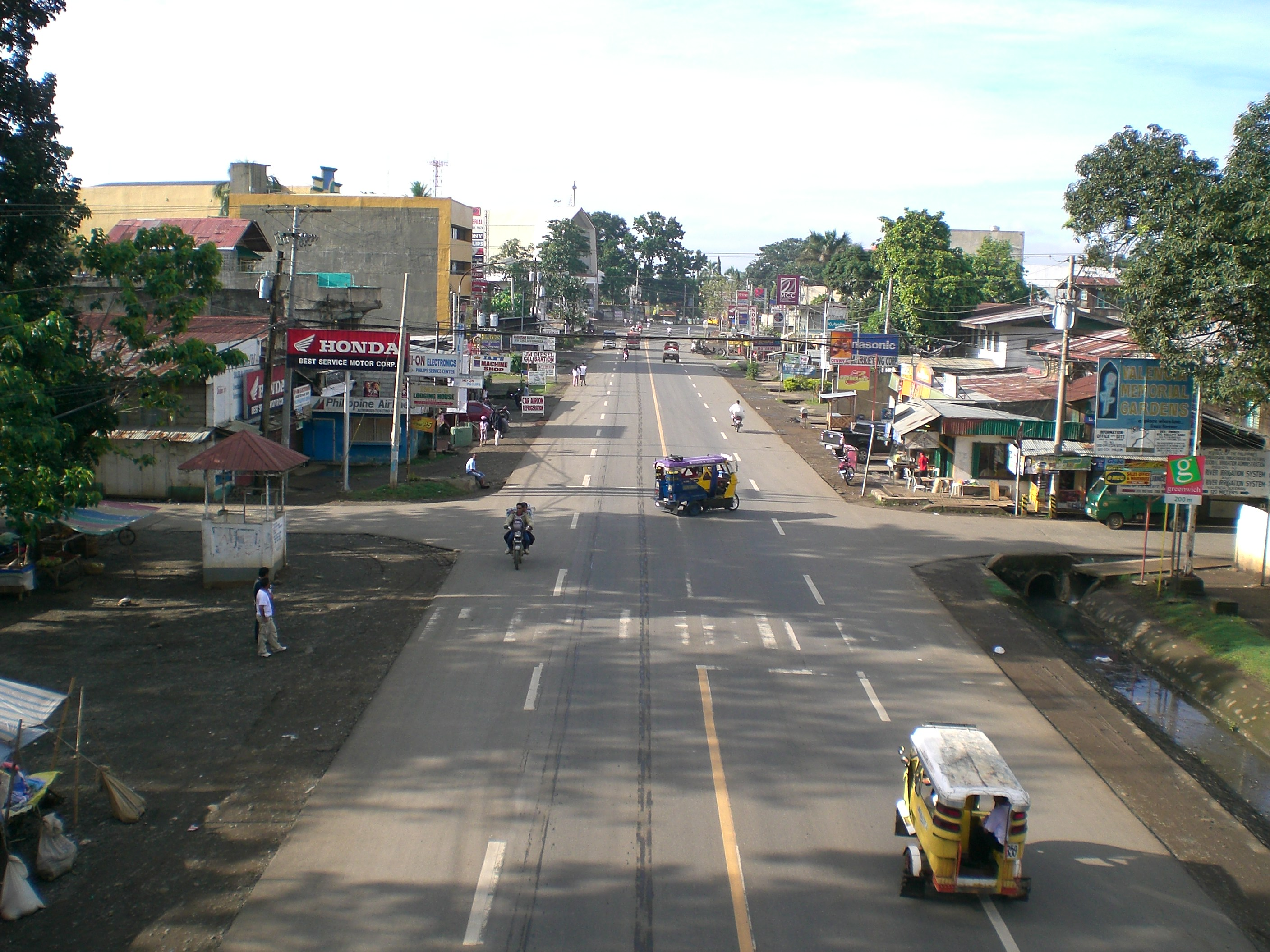
A view of Sayre Highway from Valencia City going to Maramag

Major thoroughfares in the city include Sayre Highway, G. Laviña Avenue (Guinoyuran Road in extension), and Kapalong-Talaingod-Valencia Road.

Traffic in Poblacion has become a serious problem in the city, especially with the major thoroughfares. To reduce congestion of traffic in the city center, Valencia By-pass Road is under construction with its junction in Barangay Mailag. The road will have its other end at Musuan, Maramag, Bukidnon. The City Government also implemented a one-way traffic scheme on the whole stretch of Quezon and Mabini Street. The strict implementation of traffic rules is also observed to promote road safety and order.

Common traffic choke points, which all intersects Sayre Highway, are the following: Catarata Street junction, G. Laviña Avenue junction, and Batangan Bridge junction (Kapalong-Talaingod-Valencia Road).

=== Parks and venues ===
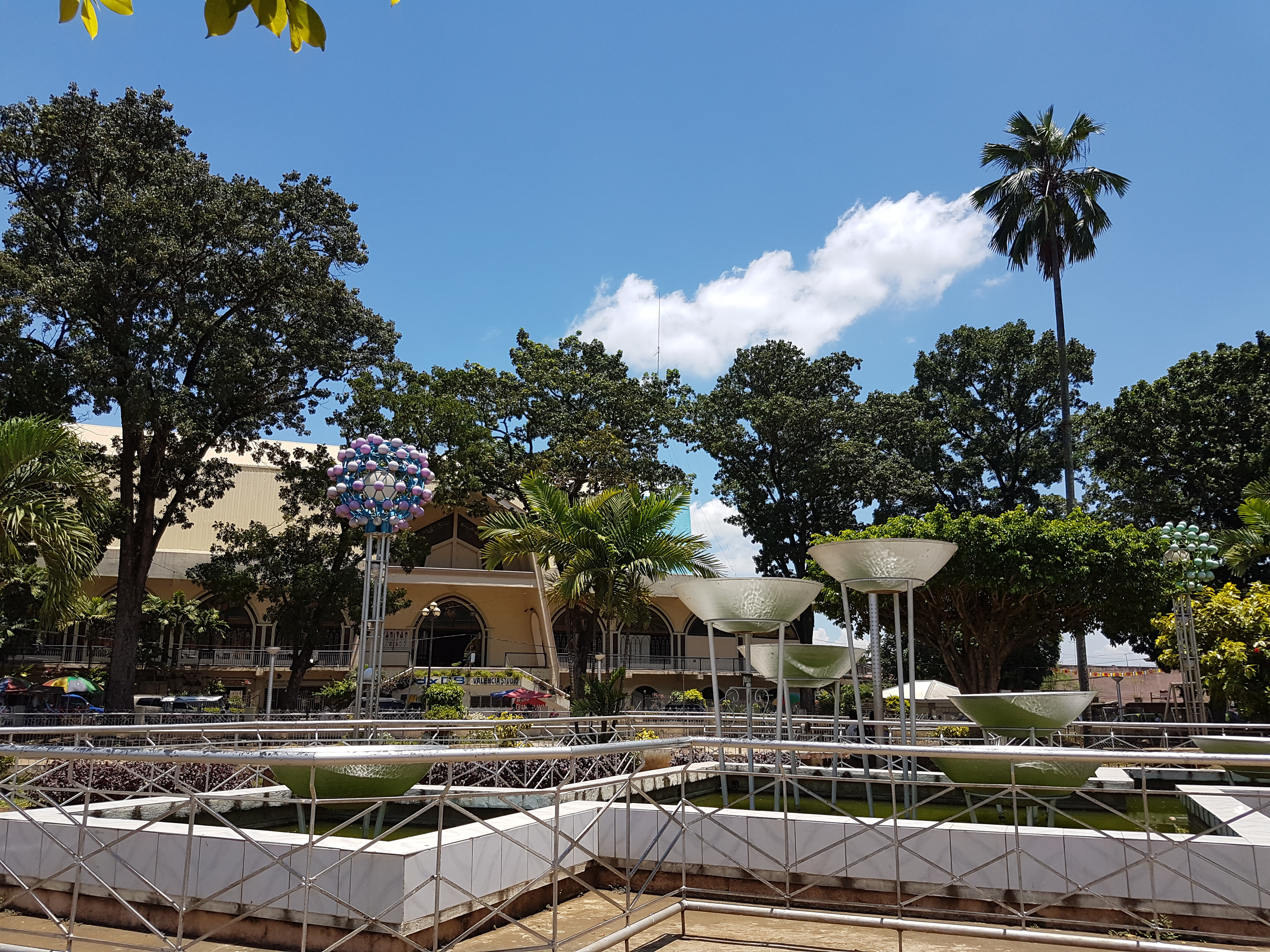
Plaza Rizal with the Saint Augustine Parish in the background

Valencia has some event centers which allow the city to host many provincial and even regional gatherings, including the Valencia City Gymnasium, SAIT Gymnasium, City Oval Grounds, Bukidnon Football Training Center, CAP Auditorium and many others. It has only one public park, which is the Plaza Rizal.

=== Utilities ===
The water system of the city is administered by the Valencia City Water District that serves five barangays, namely Poblacion, Lumbo, Bagontaas and Mailag. 29 Barangays enjoy electricity supplied by the First Bukidnon Electric Cooperative. One Barangay enjoys power supply by Bukidnon Second Electric Cooperative.

=== Communication ===
Telecommunication services are primarily offered by telephone companies such as PLDT and Sotelco, and mobile services by Smart Communications, Globe Telecom, and Dito Telecommunity. Internet services are also offered by PLDT, Smart Communications, Globe Telecom, and Dito Telecommunity.

== Healthcare ==
- Abella Midway Hospital
- Adventist Medical Center - Valencia City, Inc.
- Esther Hospital
- German Doctors Hospital
- Laviña General Hospital
- Medidas Medical Center
- Valencia Medical Hospital
- Valencia Polymedic General Hospital, Inc.

== Education ==
=== Colleges ===
Valencia City has several colleges:

College	Location
ACLC College of Bukidnon	Sayre Highway, Hagkol, Poblacion, Valencia City
Alemarz School of Science and Technology Foundation, Inc.	Purok-3B, Upland, Poblacion, Valencia City
Dagat Kidavao Central College	Barangay Dagat Kidavao, Valencia City
IBA College of Mindanao, Inc	T.N. Pepito St., Poblacion, Valencia City
Mountain View College (Main Campus)	Barangay Mount Nebo, Valencia City
Mountain View College (School of Nursing)	Sayre Highway, Malingon, Barangay Bagontaas, Valencia City
Philippine College Foundation	Hagkol, Poblacion, Valencia City
San Agustin Institute of Technology	Mabini St. (Caroselli St.), Poblacion, Valencia City
STI College – Valencia	Sayre Highway, Poblacion, Valencia City
Valencia Colleges (Bukidnon), Inc.	Hagkol, Poblacion, Valencia City

Several students are enrolled in studies at Central Mindanao University, part of the Municipality of Maramag, approximately 7 kilometers from the city proper.

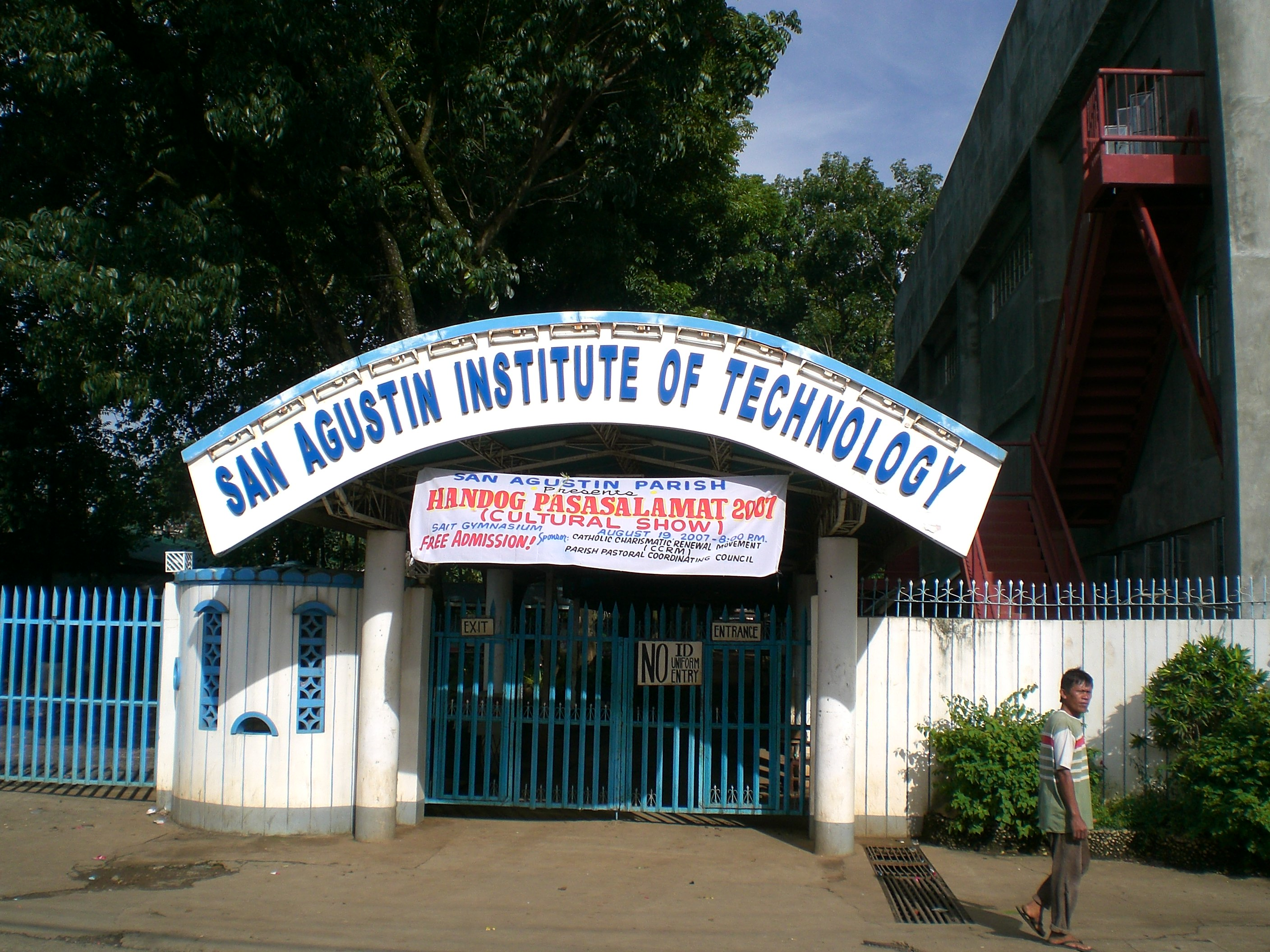
San Agustin Institute of Technology.

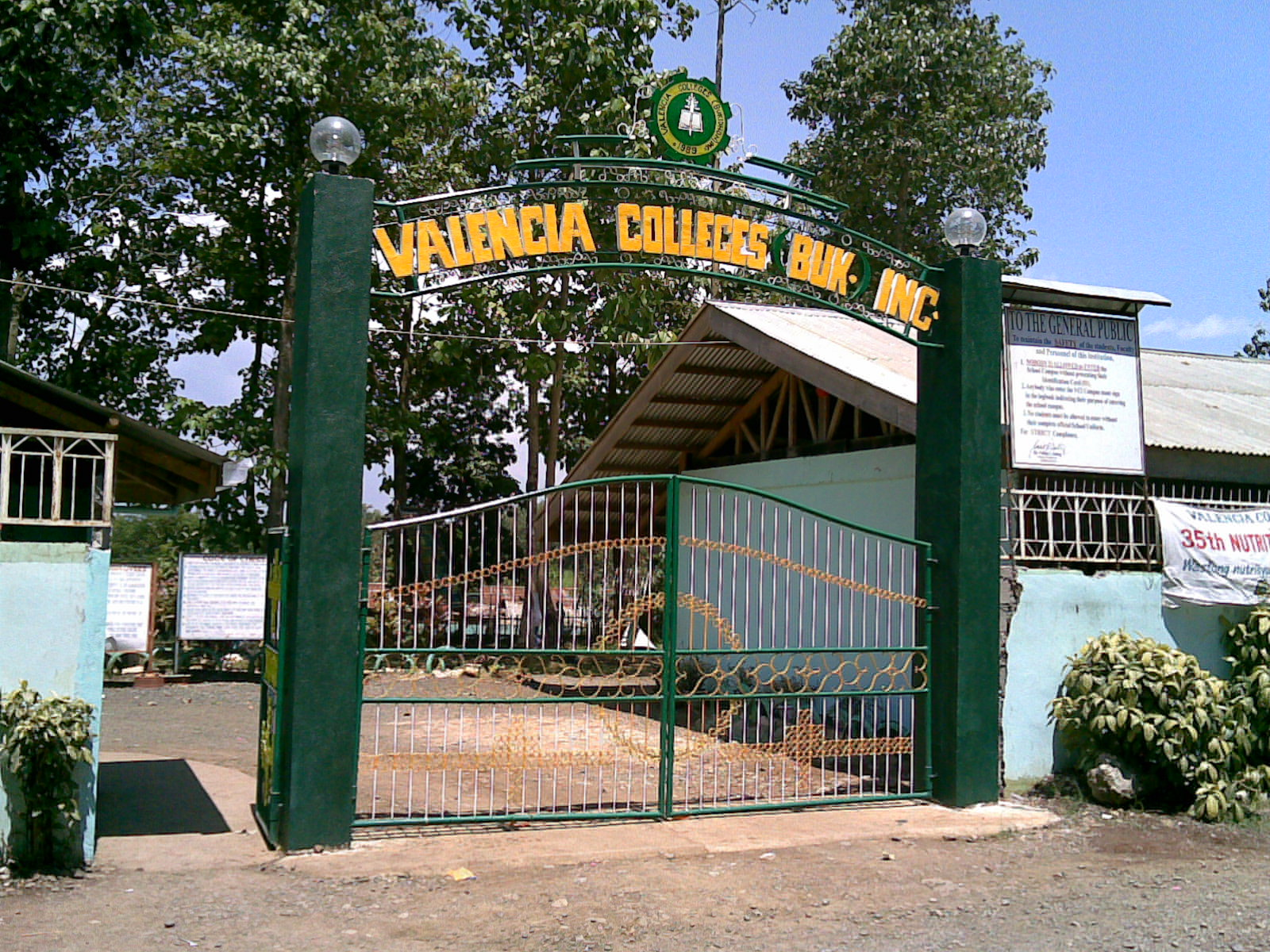
Valencia Colleges (Bukidnon), Inc.

=== Primary and secondary schools ===
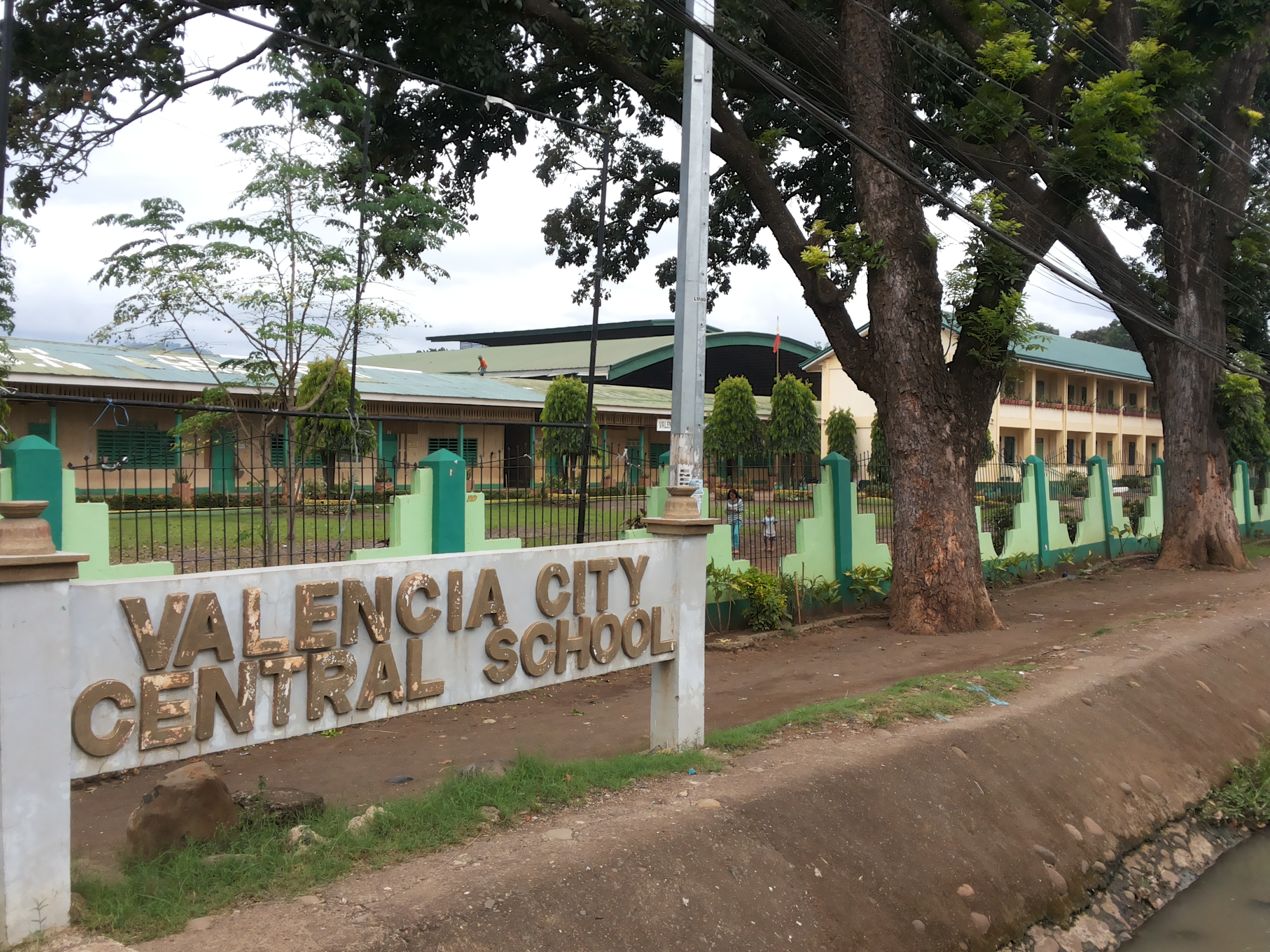
Valencia City Central School, largest elementary school in the city in terms of enrollment

Private primary and secondary schools:

- ALEMARZ School of Science and Technology Foundation, Inc.
- Bukidnon Faith Christian School, Inc.
- Bagonta-as Adventist Elementary School, Inc. (BAES)
- CFC-Valencia City School of the Morning Star
- Casiphia Baptist Christian Academy, Inc.
- Central Bukidnon Institute
- EMEU Gequillana Memorial Academy, Inc.
- Emmanuel Parakletos Christian School
- First Fruits Christian Academy
- Infant Jesus School of Bukidnon, Inc.
- Little Lamb Learning Center
- Liberty Bible Baptist Academy
- Mountain View College Academy
- Mountain View College Faith Elementary School
- San Agustin Institute of Technology
- School of the Morning Star
- Valencia Baptist Christian Academy
- Valencia Central Seventh-day Adventist Elementary School

Almost every barangay has a public primary school, the largest of which is Valencia City Central School located in Barangay Poblacion. There are other primary secondary schools in the city. However, public secondary education is primarily offered by Valencia National High School, which is also the largest in the city.

== Culture ==
=== Valencia City Hymn ===
Written and composed by songwriter Ellen "mai" D. Estore-Selecios, the Valencia City Hymn was officially enacted on February 3, 2020, by virtue of City Ordinance No. 17-2020. The Ordinance mandates the singing of the hymn in every flag raising ceremony, official public events, sports competitions, civic functions and programs and other related ceremonies within the jurisdiction of the City of Valencia.

== Media ==
=== Television ===
Free-to-air television broadcasts are provided by ABS-CBN and GMA Network through their relay broadcast towers located at Mount Kitanglad in nearby Malaybalay City and Myx will transmitter located in the city.

Cable television is available through Parasat Cable TV and Valencia Cable TV; while satellite cable are primarily provided by G Sat, Sky Direct and Cignal.

=== Radio ===
Radio stations have reception in both Valencia City and Malaybalay, allowing residents to access a range of AM and FM broadcasts from within Bukidnon and neighboring areas.

=== Malaybalay ===
- 88.1 Radyo Bandera Malaybalay (Bandera News Philippines/Palawan Broadcasting Corporation)
- 90.5 Juander Radyo Malaybalay (Malindang Broadcasting Network Corporation/RSV Broadcasting Network)
- 91.7 LCM FM (Adventist Media)
- 101.7 XFM Bukidnon (Rizal Memorial Colleges Broadcasting Corporation)
- FM Radio Bukidnon 105.1 (Philippine Collective Media Corporation)
- 106.3 Love Radio Malaybalay (Manila Broadcasting Company, which is also receivable in Valencia, providing residents access to its programming.)

=== Valencia ===
- 91.3 Infinite Radio Valencia (St. Jude Thaddeus Institute of Technology)
- 92.9 Wild FM (UM Broadcasting Network)
- 95.3 iFM Valencia (Radio Mindanao Network, Inc.)
- Hope Radio 96.9 Valencia (Hope Channel Philippines)
- 97.7 Radyo Sincero Valencia (Sarraga Intg. and Mgmt. Corp.)
- 98.5 Gold FM Radyo Kaibigan Valencia (Kalayaan Broadcasting System, Inc./Kaibigan Brotherhood Association)
- 99.3 RC FM Mano-Mano (Kaissar Broadcasting Network)
- DXRC 100.1 Radyo Commando Valencia (Valencia Community Broadcasting Company)
- 102.5 Radyo Bandera Valencia (Bandera News Philippines)
- Mellow Touch 103.3 (FBS Radio Network)
- 104.1 Yes The Best (Pacific Broadcasting System)
- 105.7 Brigada News FM Valencia (Baycomms Broadcasting Corporation/Brigada Mass Media Corporation)

=== Maramag ===
- 88.9 Development Radio (Central Mindanao University)
- 89.9 Magnet FM Maramag (Skia Broadcasting Center)
- 92.1 Radyo Abante (Iddes Broadcast Group)
- 93.7 Heart FM Bukidnon (Highland Broadcasting Network Corporation)
- 101.3 Super Bagting (Capitol Broadcasting Center/Pacific Press Media Production Corporation)
- 104.7 Radyo Pinoy (Prime Broadcasting Network, Inc.)
- 106.9 Radyo Natin Maramag (Manila Broadcasting Company/Gaudes Advertising Agency)

=== Quezon ===
- 107.7 Radyo Kilat (Subic Broadcasting Corporation/Kilat RadioKast)

=== Kalilangan ===
- 104.9 Radyo Kalilang (National Nutrition Council/Nutriskwela Community Radio)

=== Malaybalay ===
- DXDB Radyo Bandilyo 594 AM (Catholic Media Network, the oldest running radio station in Bukidnon since 1971),
- DXMB RMN Malaybalay 648 (Radio Mindanao Network)
- DXCB Bombo Radyo Malaybalay 864 (Bombo Radyo Philippines)

=== Valencia ===
- DXMV News and Public Affairs 1134 Valencia (UM Broadcasting Network)
- DXHH News 1233 Valencia (Audiovisual Communicators and ABJ Broadcasting Services) (soon)
- 1386 Hope Radio Valencia (Hope Channel Philippines).

=== Print ===
National circulating newspapers such as the Philippine Daily Inquirer, The Philippine Star, Manila Bulletin and Kastigador Balita Mindanao, are available in the city. Several local Mindanao newspapers and tabloid sheets are also circulated locally.

== Notable personalities ==
- Mario Fernandez – a multi-medalist national boxer.

== Persona non grata ==
- Richard Heydarian
