= Cabangahan =

Settlement in the Philippines

- Barangay
- Map showing the location of Cabangahan Cabangahan (Philippines)
- Coordinates: 8°1′46″N 125°8′23.7″E
- Country: Philippines
- Province: Bukidnon
- City: Malaybalay
- District: South Highway District
- Barangayhood: 1950

Government
  - Type: Barangay Council
  - Body: Sangguniang Barangay
  - Chairman: Basiledes Cahucom

Area
  - Total: 9.26 km^{2} (3.58 sq mi)
- Elevation: 365 m (1,198 ft)

Population (2015)
  - Total: 3,015
  - Density: 326/km^{2} (843/sq mi)
- PSGC: 101312004
- IRA (2020): Php 3,562,874

Cabangahan is an urbanizing barangay in the South Highway District of Malaybalay City, Bukidnon, Philippines. Located 15 kilometres south of the city proper, it is bounded to the north by Aglayan, to the east by Violeta and Simaya, to the south by Bangcud, and to the west by Bugcaon of the Municipality of Lantapan. According to the 2015 census, Cabangahan has a population of 3,015 people. Cabangahan is generally flat with minor undulations near the bank of the Sawaga River. Agriculture is the most common economic activity, with corn, rice, rubber, and sugarcane being the primary crops. There is only one public elementary school which is administered by the Division of Malaybalay City, Schools District VI.

Cabangahan is a hispanicization of the Binukid term kabangahan, which means "a place of many oil palm" [Binukid: banga]. It was first settled by the Higaonons and upon the migration of other ethnic groups into Mindanao, the settlement eventually became a sitio of Barangay Bugcaon, which was then a part of Malaybalay. In 1950, Cabangahan was separated from Bugcaon and became a regular barangay. By 1964, the Municipality of Lantapan was created which included Bugcaon; in 1966, RA 4787 further stipulated that Cabangahan remain as part of Malaybalay.
