= Central Bukidnon Institute =

Private school in Bukidnon, Philippines

Location
- Bagontaas; Valencia City, Bukidnon; Philippines; 7°56′50″N 125°06′07″E

Information
- Type: Private
- Motto: Character before Intellect
- Established: June 1968
- School district: City of Valencia
- President: Samuel Orville Jim B. Bulahan
- Principal: Orville M. Bulahan
- Staff: 29
- Enrollment: 521
- Colors: Blue, White, Yellow, Green
- Athletics: CBI Torch
- Athletics conference: CVAPSAA
- Affiliation: Seventh-day Adventist

Central Bukidnon Institute is a private school located in Bagontaas, Valencia City, Bukidnon. It offers complete secondary course which copes up from junior to senior highschool programs. It serves more than over 500 students primarily from the location itself. Central Bukidnon Institute is owned and operated privately by the OM Bulahan family and is affiliated with the Seventh-day Adventist Church.

== History ==
Mr. and Mrs. Emilio Gequillana, donated one hectare to the school Central Bukidnon Institute to open its doors on the school year 1967–1968, on its answer to the need of a secondary school. On its first year of opening of the school, it has 75 first year students and 2 teachers, Mr. Orville Bulahan, the present principal of the institution. and Mrs. Polecena Garin-Opao. The school held its first graduation exercises in 1971, with 47 senior students, 4 years after the school opens its doors. The school has a Pathfinder Club which covers up students from the first year and second year.

== See also ==
- List of Seventh-day Adventist secondary schools
- Seventh-day Adventist education
