= Robinsons Valencia =

Shopping mall in Bukidnon, Philippines

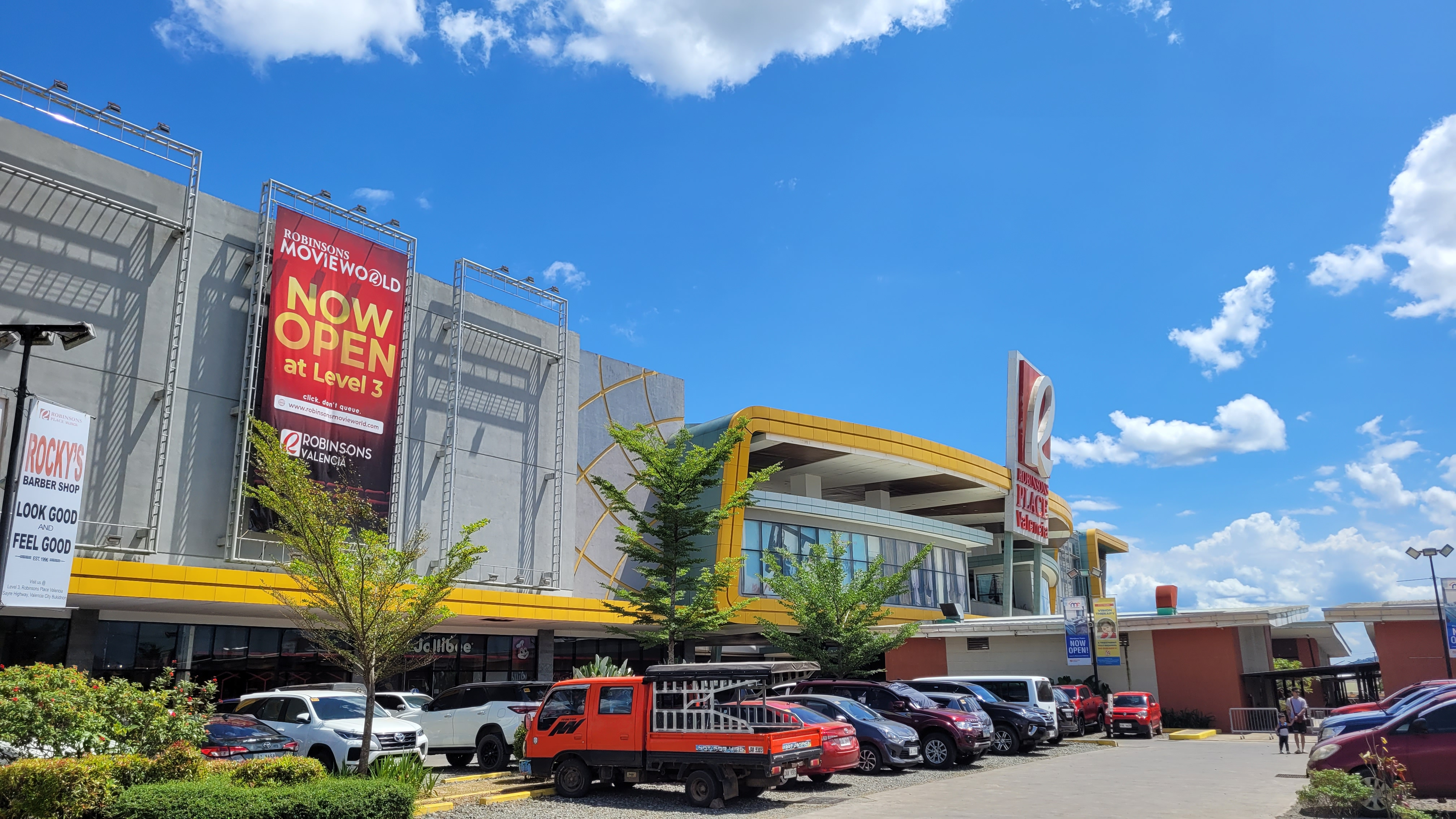
- Location: Valencia City, Bukidnon, Philippines
- Coordinates: 7°56′03″N 125°06′01″E
- Address: Sayre Highway, Brgy. Bagontaas
- Opened: December 12, 2018; 7 years ago
- Developer: Robinsons Land Corporation
- Manager: Robinsons Malls
- Owner: John Gokongwei
- Architect: Lichauco Guillas + Villanueva
- Num. of stores: 114, including 27 dining establishments
- Num. of anchor tenants: 7
- Floor area: 46,640 sq. meters
- Floors: 3
- Parking: 508 parking slots
- Website: www.robinsonsmalls.com

Robinsons Valencia (formerly known as Robinsons Place Valencia), is a three level full-service shopping mall located in Valencia, Bukidnon. The mall opened on December 12, 2018. Robinsons Place Valencia is the first national brand mall in the province of Bukidnon, the 50th Robinsons mall in the country and the seventh Robinsons mall in Mindanao.

== Development ==
The centerpiece design of the mall was inspired by pineapple fruit, of which the province of Bukidnon is well known of, and was built on an area of 80 thousand square meters. The interiors as well were pineapple inspired, of which the pillars of the atrium have yellow color and diamond pattern, and the seating areas were shaped like sliced pineapples. The mall was designed by Lichauco Guillas + Villanueva, who also designed Robinsons Place Naga. The mall has a floor area of 46,640 square meters (502,000 sq ft), with 29,095 square meters (313,180 sq ft) leasable space; the mall can accommodate over 200 stores and tenants.
