= San Agustin Institute of Technology =

Roman Catholic college in Bukidnon, Philippines

- Institusyong Teknolohiya ng San Agustin (Filipino)
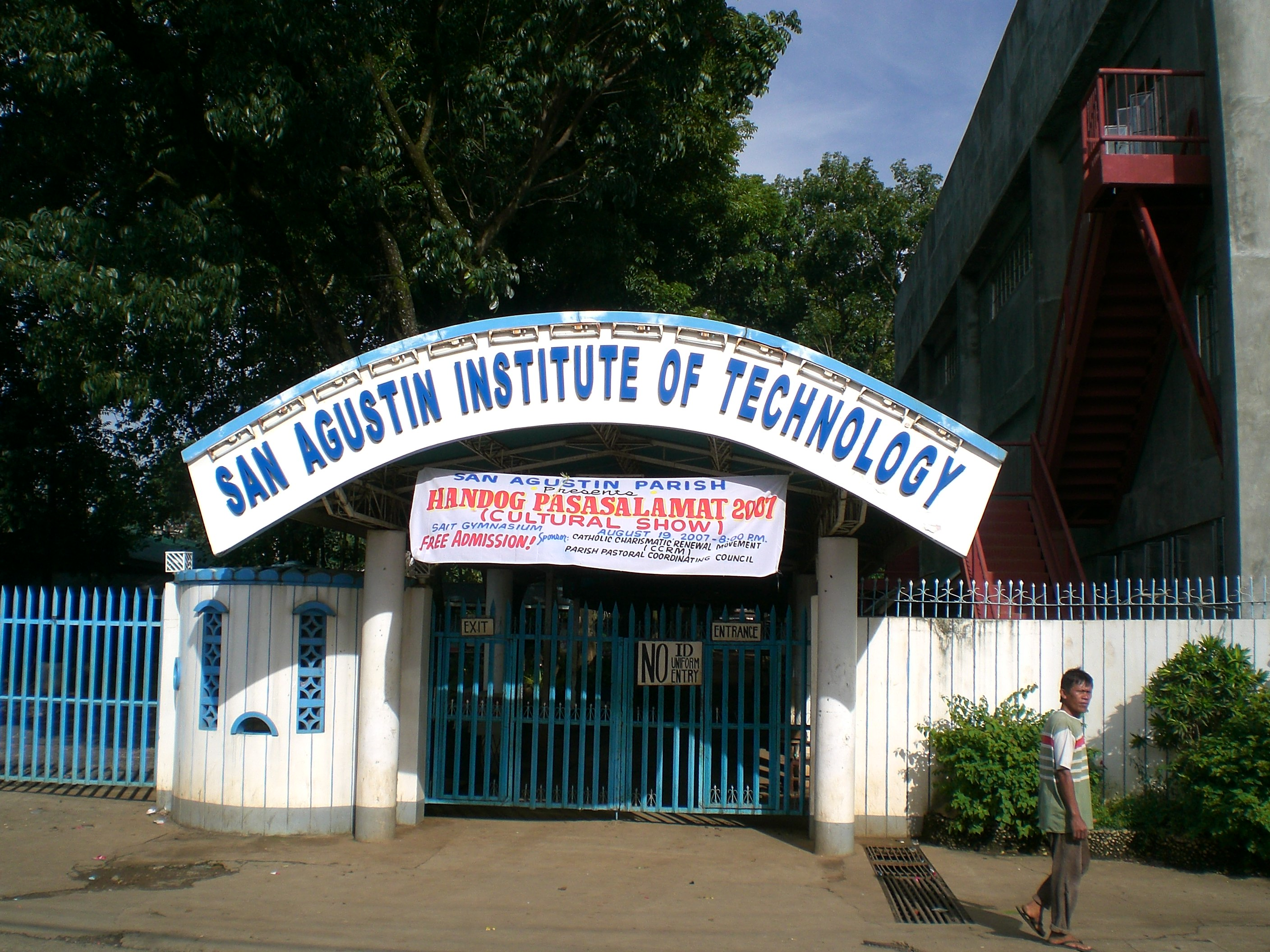
- Motto: Sacrifice and Perseverance
- Type: Private, Catholic, Higher education institution
- Established: 1960
- Religious affiliation: Roman Catholic
- President: Sr. Teresita S. Sajelan, MCM
- Location: Fr. Caroselli St. Poblacion, Valencia City, Bukidnon, Philippines; 7°54′22″N 125°05′24″E
- Website: sait.edu.ph

- Location in Mindanao Location in the Philippines

San Agustin Institute of Technology (SAIT) is a premier private Catholic higher educational institution located in Valencia City, Bukidnon, Philippines. The school offers Pre-school education up to College education. SAIT has been providing Catholic education in Valencia City for 63 years now ans counting.

== History ==
San Agustin Institute of Technology (SAIT) was established in 1960 out of funds solicited from abroad by Fr. Manlio, S.J. the Catholic Priest assigned in Valencia, Bukidnon. It started as a general high school with 101 students attending classes in the parish convent.

In 1964, MISEREOR provided assistance to SAIT in terms of equipment and instructional devices and technical services from the German Technicians who assisted the founder-director in developing a Specialized Vocational Course for girls and a Trade Technical course for boys – a Special Automotive Mechanic course.

On March 5, 2008, SAIT was able to launch the Fr. Caroselli, S.J., Development Foundation Inc. This foundation was founded in order to help the poor-but-deserving students; helping them make a difference in their life and the lives of others. Under the present administration, SAIT is made to effect improvements for the development of the students.

== Academic programs ==
=== Basic Education ===
- Preschool
- Elementary Grade School, Grades 1–6
- Junior High School, Grades 7–10
- Senior High School, Grades 11–12

=== Tertiary Education ===
- List of available courses:
  - 4-Year CHED Courses
    - Bachelor of Elementary Education
    - Bachelor of Secondary Education
      - Major in Mathematics
      - Major in Filipino
      - Major in Values Education
    - Bachelor of Technical - Vocational Teacher Education
      - Major in Automotive Technology
      - Major in Food and Service Management
      - Major in Shielded Metal Arc (Welding)
    - Bachelor of Science in Business Administration
      - Major in Marketing Management
      - Major in Human Resource Management
      - Major in Financial Management
    - Bachelor of Science in Social Work
    - Bachelor of Science in Midwifery
  - Graduate Courses
    - Graduate in Midwifery
  - 2-Year CHED Courses
    - General Clerical Course
    - Associate in Office Administration-Major in Stenography
    - Associate in Office Administration-Major in Computer
  - 1-Year TESDA Programs
    - Building Wiring Installation
    - Automotive Technology
    - Health Care Services Provider
  - New CHED Courses Applied (Started on AY 2009-2010)
    - Bachelor of Science in Technical Teacher Education (BSTTE)
    - Bachelor of Science in Entrepreneurship
    - Bachelor of Science in Office Administration

== See also ==
- Valencia City, Bukidnon
- Education in the Philippines
