= Simaya =

Simayà
- Barangay
- Location within Mindanao mainland Location within Philippines
- Coordinates: 8°0′11.6″N 125°9′19″E
- Country: Philippines
- Province: Bukidnon
- City: Malaybalay
- District: Basakan
- Barangayhood: 1954

Government
  - Type: Barangay Council
  - Body: Sangguniang Barangay
  - Chairman: Nimfa V. Bautista

Area
  - Total: 11.9 km^{2} (4.6 sq mi)

Population (2015)
  - Total: 4,161
  - Density: 350/km^{2} (906/sq mi)
- PSGC: 101312063
- IRA (2020): Php 4,428,260

Simayà is a barangay in the Basakan District of the city of Malaybalay, Philippines. As of 2015, it has a population of 4,161. It was formerly a sitio of Linabo and was converted into a regular barangay in 1954.

== Geography and socio-economic profile ==
Simayà is situated between the plains along the lower section of the Sawaga River and Mount Capistrano. It is bounded to the north by Violeta and Managok, to the east by San Martin and Sinanglanan, to the south by Santo Niño, and to the west by Bangcud and Cabangahan. It is subdivided into eleven purok. Sitio Binalbagan on the east is an easy route to hike Mount Capistrano, which is shared by Managok, Simayà, and San Martin.

Its territory is 80% dedicated to agriculture, 15% to residential purposes and the remaining parcel to commerce. Most of the agricultural land is irrigated. Rice and corn are the main crops with some fruits and vegetables produced in minor quantities. Due to its easy access to Mount Capistrano, Simayà has gained attention of tourists and hikers.
