= Poblacion, Malaybalay =

Poblacion
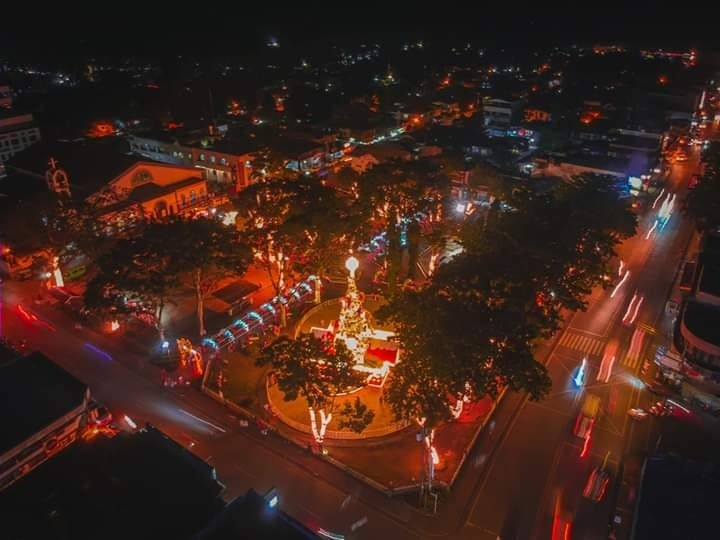
- Rizal Park in Barangay 8, Malaybalay City

- Location within Mindanao mainland Location within Philippines
- Coordinates: 8°9′15.2″N 125°7′44.2″E
- Country: Philippines
- Province: Bukidnon
- City: Malaybalay
- District: Poblacion
- Established: June 15, 1877
- Barangays: 11: Barangay 1; Barangay 2; Barangay 3; Barangay 4; Barangay 5; Barangay 6; Barangay 7; Barangay 8; Barangay 9; Barangay 10; Barangay 11

Area
  - Total: 11.58 km^{2} (4.47 sq mi)
- Elevation: 600 m (2,000 ft)

Population (2015)
  - Total: 26,579
  - Density: 2,295/km^{2} (5,945/sq mi)
- Time zone: PST (UTC+8)

Poblacion District refers to the poblacion (city center) of Malaybalay, Philippines. It is composed of eleven barangays and has an aggregate population of 26,579 and an area of 12.72 square kilometers. It is bounded to the north by Sumpong, to the east by Can-ayan, to the south by Casisang, and to the west by Kalasungay.

== Geography ==
The district is located in central Malaybalay along the Sawaga River, which splits the district roughly into two parts. The eastern half is densely populated and comprises the barangays 1 to 9. The western half is a former sitio called Impalambong and is composed of Barangay 10 and Barangay 11. The eastern boundary is hilly while the west is an undulating terrain.

== History ==
Poblacion was its own barangay since the foundation of Malaybalay in 1877. Since then, sitios such as Sumpong and Casisang were separated to become their own barangays. In 1972, then Mayor Timoteo Ocaya implemented the subdivision of Barangay Poblacion, including Impalambong, by virtue of Presidential Decrees no. 86, 86A, and 210. This created twenty new barangays from Poblacion, based on the purok system, where purok leaders were appointed as provisional Barangay Chairmen. The system proved cumbersome and unwieldy which led to the Municipal Council of Malaybalay to pass Ordinance No. 87 in 1974, downsizing the number of barangays to eleven. New borders were drawn such that some of the barangays are merged, parceled out to other barangays, or split. Impalambong, a sitio of Poblacion, was split into Barangay 18, Barangay 19, and Barangay 20 in 1972. By 1974, the new ordinance designated Barangay 18 as Barangay 10 and merged Barangay 19 and Barangay 20 to form Barangay 11. In the town proper, Barangay 1 and Barangay 6 were merged to form Barangay 1; Barangay 13, Barangay 14, and Barangay 17 were merged to form Barangay 7; Barangay 15 was dismembered to form parts of the present-day Barangay 6 and Barangay 8. The current designation (i.e. number) of barangays of Poblacion District was not necessarily designated as the number it was originally assigned in 1972. Furthermore, the dissolution of Barangay Poblacion in 1972 and its subsequent reorganization in 1974 led to the creation of the Administrative District of Poblacion when Malaybalay was converted into a city in 1998.

== Barangays ==
Since 1974, the former Barangay Poblacion was subdivided into eleven barangays, all are urban areas. They have their own barangay councils, composed of the Punong Barangay, seven Kagawad, the SK Chairman, and the indigenous peoples' mandatory representative (IPMR). All barangays operate according to the local government code.

Profile of Barangays in Poblacion
Barangay	Area (km^{2})	Population (2020)	Density (sq. km)	PSGC
Barangay 01	1.32	6,442	4,880	101312038
Barangay 02	0.12	587	4,891	101312045
Barangay 03	0.18	438	2,433	101312046
Barangay 04	0.11	344	3,127	101312047
Barangay 05	0.03	71	2,366	101312048
Barangay 06	1.11	474	427	101312049
Barangay 07	0.24	1,891	7,879	101312050
Barangay 08	0.06	579	9650	101312051
Barangay 09	2.65	9,187	3,468	101312052
Barangay 10	2.23	3,447	1,546	101312053
Barangay 11	4.67	3,034	650	101312054
