= Mindanao Mission Academy =

Private high school in Misamis Oriental, Philippines

Coordinates: 8°23.78094′N 124°17.15886′E

- Manticao, Misamis Oriental, (Philippines); Philippines

Information
- Type: Private
- Motto: The School That Offers Something Better
- Established: 1947
- School district: Manticao
- Principal: Jeoneffer L. Blanza,JD
- Grades: 7-12
- Campus: Suburban
- Nickname: MMA: The School That Offers Something Better
- Affiliation: Seventh-day Adventist Church
- Website: https://mindanaomissionacademy.org/

Mindanao Mission Academy (or MMA) is a private Seventh-day Adventist high school in Purok 15, Poblacion, Manticao, Misamis Oriental, Philippines. It is a boarding school operated by the North-Central Mindanao Conference of Seventh-day Adventists. It is situated in a 20-hectare lot along the Butuan-Cagayan de Oro-Iligan Highway.

== History ==
MMA is the oldest Adventist high school in the Southern Philippines, and was the fifth in the entire Philippines when it was established on July 14, 1947. It obtained full government recognition two years later (on July 1, 1949). Before becoming a high school, it was an elementary school in 1946 and was called Mindanao Central School.

It derived its name from the then Mindanao Mission (which later became South Philippine Union Conference), which was organized ten years earlier (in 1937) and was formerly part of the East Visayan Mission. It also served as the host campus for Mountain View College (then known as Philippine Union Junior College) for a four-year period that started in 1949.

Its first principal and business manager was Pastor Arsenio A. Poblete, who served for seven years. It had ten faculty members during its first year of operation.
