= Malibato =

Malibato may refer to the following tree species found in the Philippines:

- Hopea malibato
- Shorea malibato
