= Gerald Tabios =

Filipino long-distance runner (born 1969)

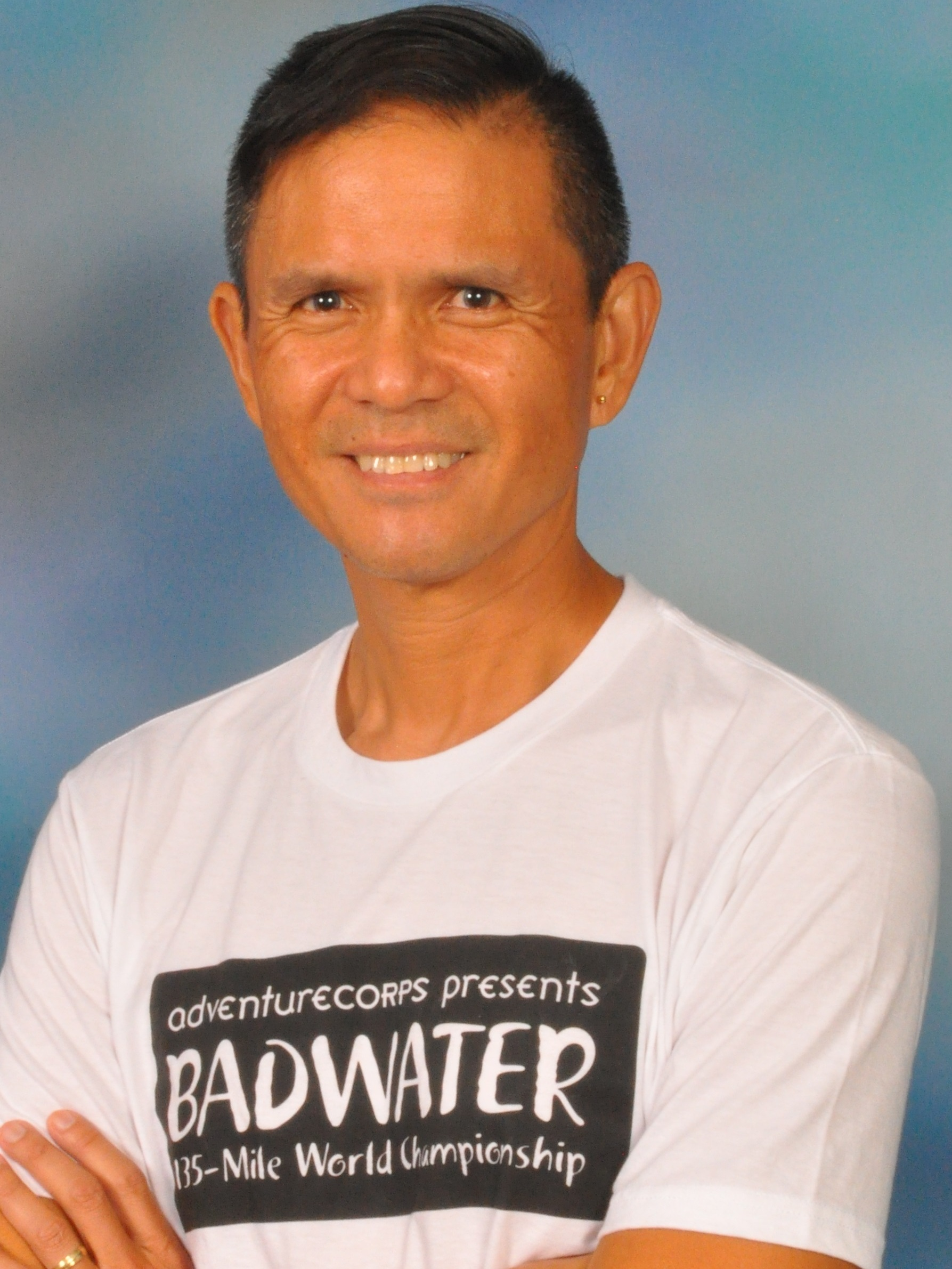

Personal information
- Full name: Gerald Tabios
- Born: 12 September 1969 (age 57) Malaybalay, Bukidnon, Philippines
- Height: 1.72 m (5 ft 8 in)
- Weight: 68 kg (150 lb)
- Website: www.geraldtabios.com

Sport
- Country: Philippines
- Sport: Running
- Event: Ultramarathon

Achievements and titles
- Personal bests: Badwater 135 m: 37:54:22 (2017); The Great New York 100 m: 21:22:34 (2014); Lake Waramaug 100K: 9:37:05 (2015); Caumsett Park 50k: 4:21:39 (2016); 6-Hour Timed Race: 41.3 m, Staten Island 6-Hr (2014); 48-Hour Timed Race: 171 MILES, 3 Days at the Fair (2015); Marathon: 3:19:17, Steamtown Marathon (2015)

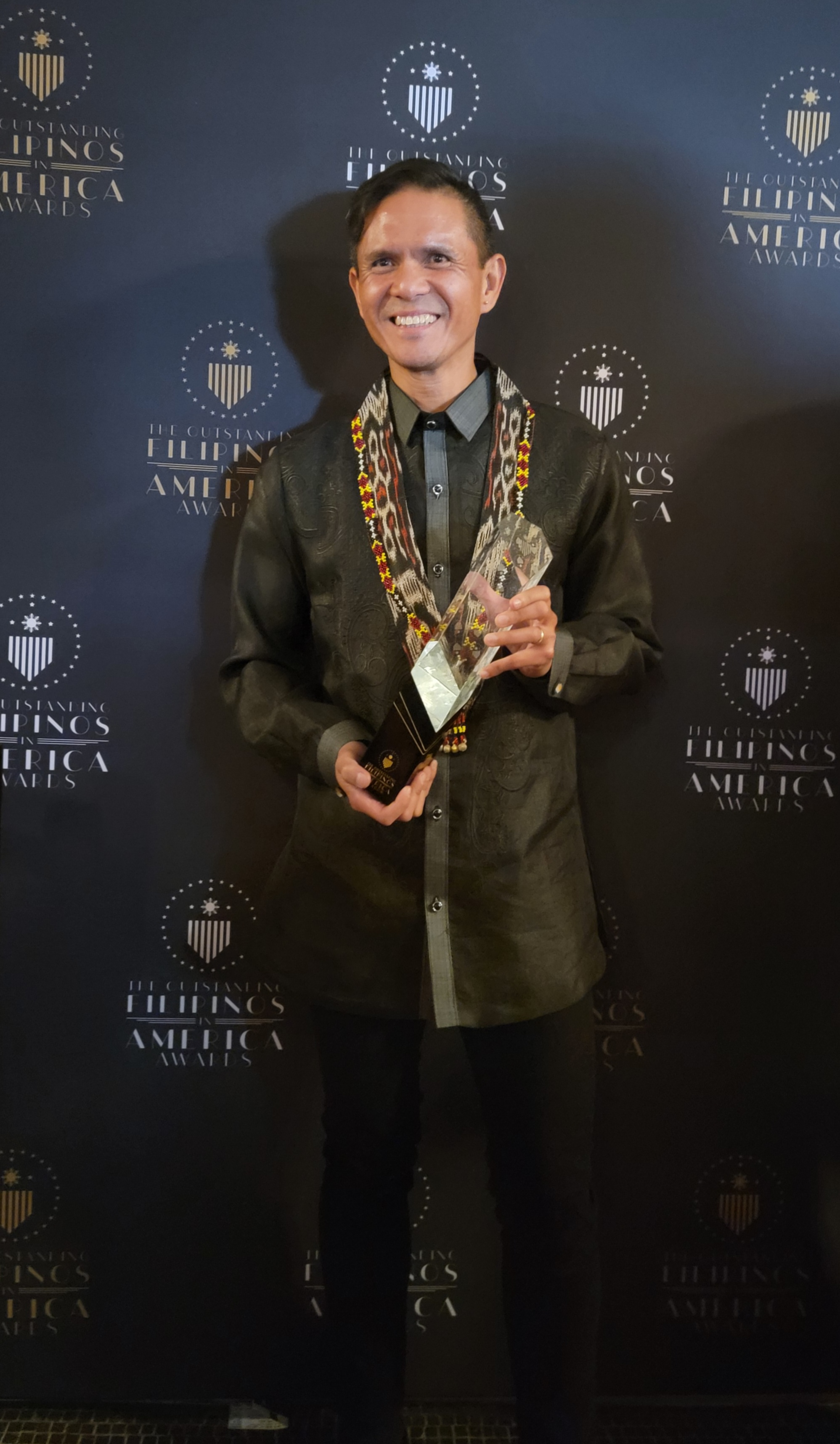
Tabios receiving the 2022 TOFA Awards in sports

Gerald Tabios (born September 12, 1969) is a Filipino long-distance runner and Ultramarathon runner. Among his most notable races in the United States is the Badwater Ultramarathon. This is an annual race that stretches 135 miles through Death Valley, California in July and ends after a steep climb of Mount Whitney. In the world of Ultramarathons this race, where temperatures often reach 130 °F, is frequently coined "The Toughest Foot Race in the World." Tabios is a 8-time Badwater 135 finisher.

During his 2014 Badwater 135 race, he believed that this feat of great importance and a chance to collaborate with a charity.

On July 23, 2014, he was able to raise the amount of $1,200.00 for the charity through the US Fund of UNICEF which will ultimately be used in the rehabilitation\rebuilding of structures damaged by Typhoon Haiyan\Yolanda in Leyte and Samar, Philippines.

== Early life ==
Gerald Tabios was born in Malaybalay, Bukidnon, Philippines, on 12 September 1969. He graduated from Xavier University in Civil Engineering in Cagayan de Oro, Philippines. In 2001, Tabios emigrated to New York with his wife.

== Career ==
In 2004, Tabios ran his first Marathon at the New York City Marathon. He has completed more than 170 marathons/ultramarathons. On July 18, 2016, he attempted the Badwater 146. The 146 miles trek from the Badwater point (Elev. -282) in the Death Valley National Park to the summit of Mount Whitney (Elev. 14,505'), the highest point in the continental US and ended the trek at Mount Whitney Trail Crest just shy of 1.9 miles from the top at elevation 13,600 ft.

== Movie ==
Running for Freedom (Documentary film)

In July 2018, he was the subject of a documentary film, Running for Freedom: My Journey as an Ultra Marathon Runner by independent filmmaker James Castillo, based in Los Angeles, CA. The story is about running his 5th Badwater 135, considered as the world's toughest footrace. Together with his crew, Gerald has to cross 2 deserts, climb 3 mountains, and run 135 miles during record-breaking heat across Death Valley within 48 hrs. The 2018 Badwater 135 is a record breaking year in Death Valley, 127 degrees that broke 1906's record of 126 degrees. Out of the 99 runners, 30 DNF(did not finish).

It had its world premiere at the Cebu International Film Festival on September 27, 2019, and the North American Premiere at the International Film Festival Manhattan on November 17, 2019.

== Awards ==
On September 16, 2022, Tabios received an award at the 2022 Outstanding Filipinos in America, TOFA held in The Town Hall, Times Square, New York in sports for his long distance running.

== Achievements ==
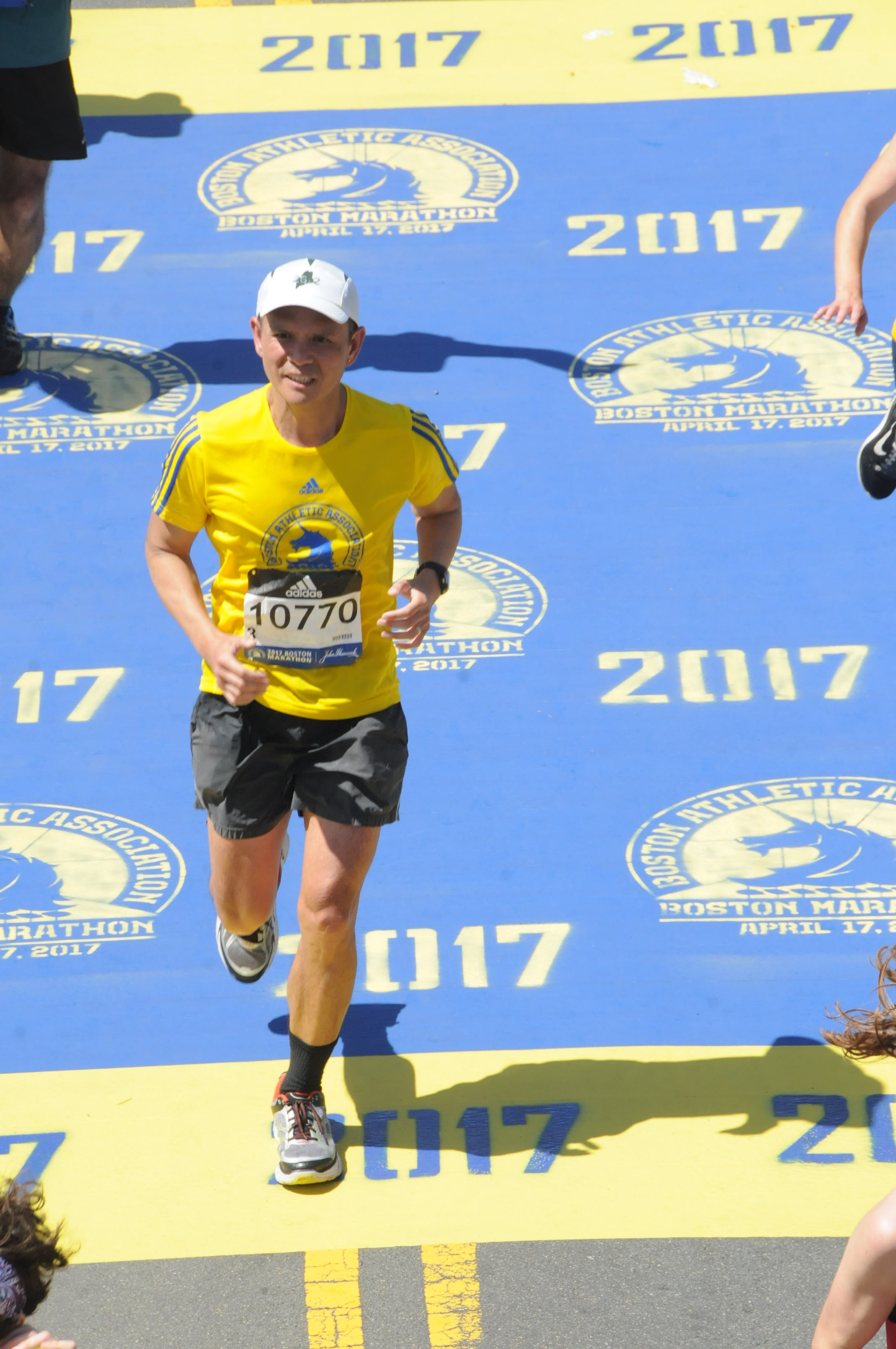
Finishing at the 2017 Boston Marathon

- 15 New York City Marathon completer (2004, 2005, 2006, 2007, 2008, 2009, 2010, 2011, 2012, 2014, 2015, 2016, 2017, 2018, 2019).
- 8-time finisher of The Great New York 100 Miles Running Exposition (2012, 2013, 2014, 2015, 2016, 2017, 2018, and 2019).
- Competed in seven 48-Hours Timed Race Ultramarathon at the 3 Days at the Fair in Augusta, New Jersey. 2013 (second Place), 2014, 2015 (second Place), 2016 (first Place), 2017 (second Place), 2018 (second place), 2019.
- Finished Lake Waramaug 100k Ultramarathon in 2012, 2013, 2014 (first Place) in 2015 (second Place) and in 2016 (second Place), 2017.
- Awarded First Place, Male Age Group 40–44, New York Ultrarunning Grand Prix in 2014.
- Awarded First Place, Male Age Group 45–49, New York Ultrarunning Grand Prix in 2017.
- Top 100k Men Finisher in North America in 2015 and 2016, rank #64 and #92 respectively.
- Completed the 2018 BADWATER ULTRA CUP (Badwater Cape Fear, Badwater Salton Sea and the Badwater 135)
- 2017 Boston Marathon Finisher.
