= Mountain View College (Philippines) =

Christian college in Bukidnon, Philippines

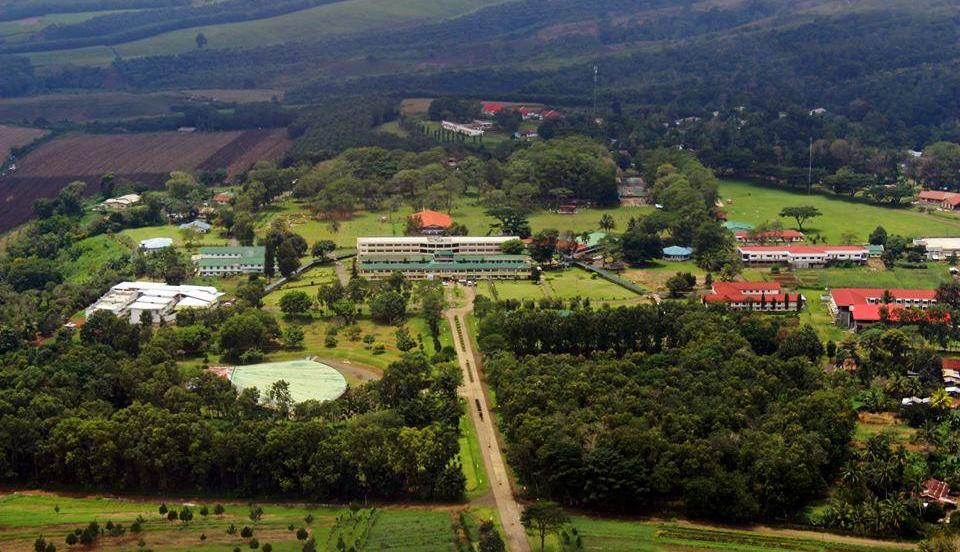
- Motto: Shine On Till Jesus Comes
- Type: Private, Sectarian
- Established: 1949
- Affiliations: Seventh-day Adventist Church, Association of Christian Schools, Colleges, and Universities
- President: Dr. Remwil R. Tornalejo
- Students: 1717
- Location: Valencia, Bukidnon, Philippines; 7°58.9′N 125°00.4′E
- Campus: Rural and Suburban
- Colours: Blue and White
- Nicknames: MVC, The School of the Light
- Website: www.mvc.edu.ph
- Location in Mindanao Location in the Philippines

Mountain View College (or MVC) is a private, co-educational, Seventh-day Adventist college in Valencia, Bukidnon, Philippines which was established in 1949. It was the second Adventist college to be established in the Philippines and the first in Mindanao. It is a part of the Seventh-day Adventist education system, the world's second largest Christian school system.

As of 2023, it had a total semestral enrollment of 2,317. These students are primarily from Mindanao, although there are quite a number from Luzon and the Visayas. International enrollment from Asia, Africa, Europe, and North America comprises about five percent of the total student population.

== History ==
MVC was founded by Andrew Nathaniel Nelson primarily in response to the growing interest in Christian education within the Philippines. A 584% increase for a six-year period in the college enrollment of Philippine Union College when he was then president, magnified the problems associated with the less-than-ideal location of the campus, leading him to the formulation of nine-point criteria for the location of an Adventist college. They were founded on Adventist principles and prior experience (involvement in the founding of Seattle Junior Academy in 1915 and the relocation of Japan Missionary College in 1926).

Although Nelson's criteria were perceived as too idealistic by some of his colleagues, he was determined to find such a site. His search focused on the island of Mindanao, since part of the criteria involved the incidence of typhoons, which was a rare occurrence in that island. The campus of Mindanao Mission Academy, situated in Manticao, Misamis Oriental, served as MVC's temporary campus from 1949 to 1952, while the search was on for a site that met the criteria. It was then known as Philippine Union College Mindanao.

Nelson and his team arrived at MVC's current site in 1950. Negotiations for the purchase of property were then started. After the purchase, initial structures were set up. In 1952, the name "Mountain View College" was chosen from a list that included "Philippine Missionary College" and "Oriental Missionary College". In 1953, classes officially started at the new location. MVC's first offerings were certificates or associate degrees in business, education, and religion. It held its first graduation exercises in 1957.

As of 2009, the college has 132 full-time and part-time teaching faculty members and 73 staff members in the industrial and support service departments.

== Presidents ==
Name	Capacity	Term start	Term end	References
Andrew N. Nelson	President	1949	1953	
Virgil Louis Bartlett	President	1953	1955	
Todd C. Murdoch	President	1955	1963	
Irene Wakeham	Acting President	1960	1962	
Douglas K. Brown	President	1963	1968	
Agripino C. Segovia	President	1969	1970	
Donald R. Halenz	President	1970	1973	
Agripino C. Segovia	President	1973	1976	
Bayani R. Arit	President	1976	1977	
Eleazar Alburo Moreno	President	1977	1979	
Anastasio B. Gayao	President	1979	1984	
Gerundio U. Ellacer	President	1984	1985	
Jose D. Dial	President	1985	1986	
Remelito A. Tabingo	President	1986	1995	
Abelardo M. Era	President	1996	2000	
Jeremias A. Valleramos	President	2001	2004	
Norma Pasco Lachica	Acting President	2004	2005	
Don Leo M. Garilva	Acting President	2006	2006	
Daniel D. Dial	President	2006	2012	
Don Leo M. Garilva	President	2012	2016	–
Gladden O. Flores	President	2016	2022	–
Remwil R. Tornalejo	President	2022	–	–

== See also ==
- List of Seventh-day Adventist colleges and universities
- Seventh-day Adventist education
