= Mapayag =

Settlement in the Philippines

- Barangay
- Map of Mindanao showing the location of Mapayag Mapayag (Philippines)
- Coordinates: 8°05′07″N 125°02′25″E
- Country: Philippines
- Province: Bukidnon
- City: Malaybalay
- District: South Highway District
- Barangayhood: May 12, 1960

Government
  - Type: Barangay Council
  - Body: Sangguniang Barangay
  - Chairman: Conrado Sungkit

Area
  - Total: 13.4 km^{2} (5.2 sq mi)
- Elevation: 1,181 m (3,875 ft)

Population (2015 census)
  - Total: 979
  - Density: 73.1/km^{2} (189/sq mi)
- PSGC: 101312034
- IRA: ₱ 2.169 million (2021)

Mapayag is a rural barangay in the South Highway District of Malaybalay, Bukidnon, Philippines. According to the 2015 census, it has a population of 979 people.

It is located on the foothills of the Kitanglad Mountain Range and is bordered to the north by Imbayao and Casisang, to the east by Magsaysay, to the southeast by Aglayan, to the south by Capitan Juan and Kaatuan of the Municipality of Lantapan, and to the west by the Mt. Kitanglad Range Natural Park. The name Mapayag is a Binukid word which translates to "clear" or "distinct", alluding to its high elevation. Primarily agricultural, its main products are vegetables, corn, sugarcane, and coffee; the latter is a growing industry.
