= Violeta, Malaybalay =

Settlement in the Philippines

Violeta Sawaga
- Barangay
- Map of Mindanao showing the location of Violeta Violeta (Philippines)
- Coordinates: 8°02′07″N 125°09′12″E
- Country: Philippines
- Province: Bukidnon
- City: Malaybalay
- District: Basakan
- Barangayhood: December 8, 1988

Government
  - Type: Barangay Council
  - Body: Sangguniang Barangay
  - Chairman: Efren Omallao
- Elevation: 327 m (1,073 ft)

Population (2015 census)
  - Total: 2,199
- PSGC: 101312066
- IRA: ₱ 3.158 million (2021)

Violeta is a rural barangay in the Basakan District of Malaybalay, Bukidnon, Philippines. According to the 2015 census, it has a population of 2,199 people. It is bordered to the north by Linabo, to the east by Managok, to the south by Simaya, and to the west by Cabangahan and Aglayan, separated by the Sawaga River.

== Overview ==
It is mainly an agricultural community with rice, sugarcane, and corn as the principal products. It was a sitio of Linabo named Sawaga. Due to insufficient funding for its development, Tiburcio Ando, a resident of Sawaga and Linabo barangay treasurer, petitioned for its conversion into a regular barangay. On December 8, 1988, it was approved and the new barangay was renamed Violeta, in honor of Violeta Tabios Labaria, the lawmaker who sponsored its creation. The name "Sawaga" is still in use, such as in its only public school, Sawaga Elementary School. However, it has fallen into disfavor to avoid confusion with the Sawaga River.
