= Magsaysay (disambiguation) =

Magsaysay may mean:

- Ramon Magsaysay (1907–1957), the seventh President of the Philippines
- Ramon Magsaysay Jr. (born 1938), his son, a former Philippine senator
- The Ramon Magsaysay Award, was established in Ramon Magsaysay's honor
- Anita Magsaysay-Ho (1914–2012), Filipina painter (cousin of Ramon)

== Places in the Philippines named after Ramon Magsaysay ==
- Magsaysay, Davao del Sur, a municipality
- Magsaysay, Lanao del Norte, a municipality
- Magsaysay, Libjo, a barangay in the province of Dinagat Islands
- Magsaysay, Malaybalay, a barangay
- Magsaysay, Misamis Oriental, a municipality
- Magsaysay, Occidental Mindoro, a municipality
- Magsaysay, Palawan, a municipality
- Ramon Magsaysay, Zamboanga del Sur, a municipality
- Magsaysay Boulevard, a street in Metro Manila
- Fort Magsaysay in Nueva Ecija
