= Managok =

Settlement in the Philippines

- Barangay
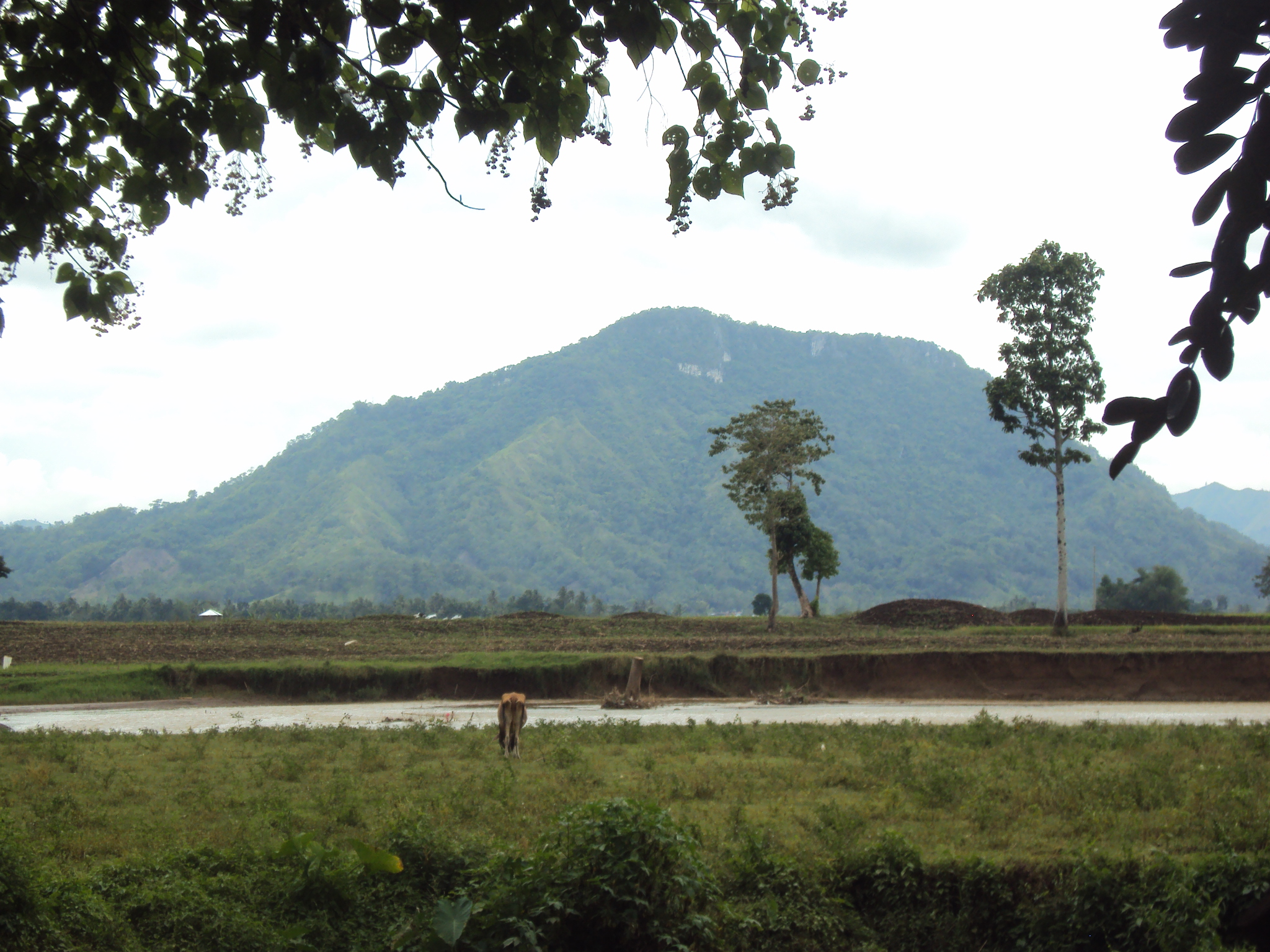
- Mount Capistrano

- Map of Mindanao showing the location of Managok Managok (Philippines)
- Coordinates: 8°01′44″N 125°11′19″E
- Country: Philippines
- Province: Bukidnon
- City: Malaybalay
- District: Basakan District

Government
  - Type: Barangay Council
  - Body: Sangguniang Barangay
  - Chairman: Aries Vincent Jurolan

Area
  - Total: 30.277 km^{2} (11.690 sq mi)
- Elevation: 346 m (1,135 ft)

Population (2015 census)
  - Total: 7,200
  - Density: 240/km^{2} (620/sq mi)
- PSGC: 101312031
- IRA: ₱ 2.169 million (2021)

Managok is an urbanizing barangay in the Basakan District of Malaybalay, Bukidnon, Philippines. According to the 2015 census, it has a population of 7,200 people.

It is bounded to the north by Linabo and Maligaya, to the east by Miglamin, to the south by San Martin, to the southwest by Simaya, and to the west by Violeta. Situated on a fertile plain of the Sawaga Valley, it is a major rice producing area in the city. It is drained by the Abuhan and Balongkot Rivers, which is a source for irrigation for many farmers. It is the most populous village in the Basakan District and it serves as the district's center. The village was home to Bukidnon National Agricultural School which was later transferred to Musuan as Central Mindanao University. Mount Capistrano, a culturally important landmark, is shared by Managok, Simayà, and San Martin. The trail in Managok is the easiest to trek.
