= Aglayan =

Settlement in the Philippines

- Barangay
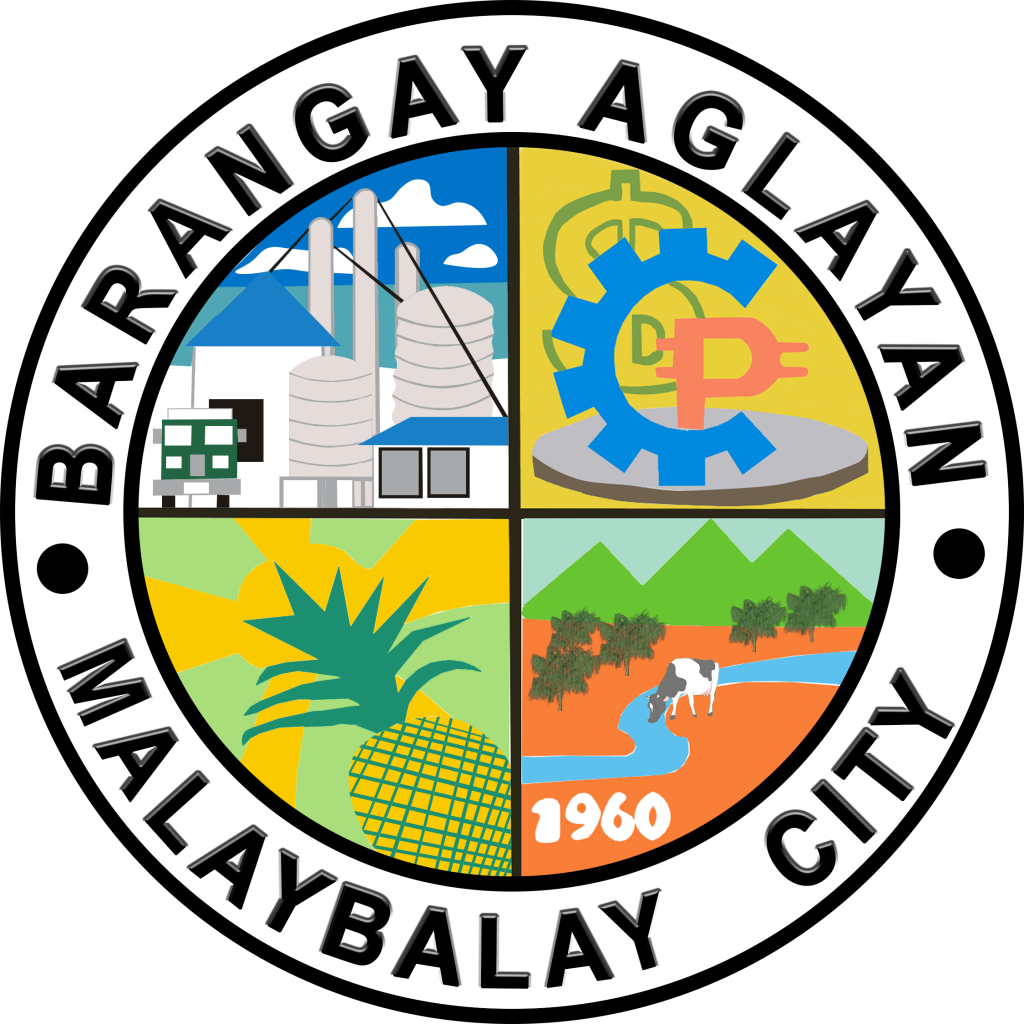
- Seal

- Map of Mindanao showing the location of Aglayan Aglayan (Philippines)
- Coordinates: 8°3′11.5″N 125°8′7.4″E
- Country: Philippines
- Province: Bukidnon
- City: Malaybalay
- District: South Highway District
- Barangayhood: 1960

Government
  - Type: Barangay Council
  - Body: Sangguniang Barangay
  - Chairman: Glorio D. Sajulga

Area
  - Total: 35.00 km^{2} (13.51 sq mi)
- Elevation: 404 m (1,325 ft)

Population (2015)
  - Total: 7,594
  - Density: 217.0/km^{2} (562.0/sq mi)
- Demonyms: Aglayanen (Binukid), Aglayanon (Cebuano)
- PSGC: 101312001
- IRA (2020): Php 7,020,642

Aglayan is an urban barangay of the City of Malaybalay in the Province of Bukidnon, Philippines. According to the 2015 census, Aglayan has a population of 7,594 people.

== Geography ==
Aglayan is bounded to the north by Laguitas, Magsaysay, and Mapayag; to the east by Linabo; to the south by Violeta and Cabangahan; and to the west by Bugcaon and Capitan Juan in the municipality of Lantapan. It has an area of 3,500 hectares characterized by a flat terrain in the south and a rising terrain in the northeast, touching the foothills of the Kitanglad Range at the source of the Aglayan Creek. The only important water bodies around Aglayan are Aglayan Creek, Cabangahan Creek, and the Sawaga River. Politically, Aglayan is composed of 14 purok, with Purok 6B as the most populated and Purok 5B as the least populated. Most of the territory of Aglayan is invested in agriculture, while a small fraction is dedicated to residential, commercial, and industrial uses. Aglayan has four sitios within its jurisdiction. These are: Upper Kapayawan on the west, Lower Kapayawan on the south (the village proper), Mahayahay (Purok 6) to the east, and Lukdu or Upper Aglayan (Purok 5) to the north.

== Economy ==
Major crops produced in Aglayan are maize, sugarcane, pineapple, banana, rubber, and adlai. Due to its strategic location at the crossroads of Northern Mindanao, Aglayan is a prospective center of commerce and a transportation hub of Malaybalay. Aglayan serves as a first distribution point of agricultural and fishery products for the city of Malaybalay and the entrance to the Basakan District and the municipalities of Cabanglasan and Lantapan. Moreover, Aglayan connects Malaybalay to other major cities in Mindanao such as Cagayan de Oro and Davao (via Sayre Highway), Iligan and Butuan (via Mindanao East-West Lateral Road), and Gingoog (via Malaybalay-Gingoog Road). As a result, commerce and industry make up a significant part of the economy of Aglayan and Malaybalay as a whole.

== History ==
Aglayan is a Binukid term which means "a place of many aglay (adlai or Job's tears)". The area of what is now Aglayan was first inhabited by the Higaonon people and eventually became a sitio of Barrio Malaybalay of the pueblo of Oroquita del Interior in 1877. This area was the entry point to Linabo, a community established by Spanish missionaries. By 1948, Aglayan has had organized administration despite only being a sitio of Malaybalay. In 1960, through the approval of Resolution no. 53 series of 1960 by the Municipal Council of Malaybalay, Aglayan was officially converted into a regular barangay. As a regular barangay, Aglayan has experienced growth in population and economy as it became a hub of transportation and commerce in the city and the province. In 1990, it had reached a population greater than 4,000. By 1998, when Malaybalay became a chartered city, Aglayan became an urban barangay as a result.
