= Malaybalay =

Capital city of Bukidnon, Philippines

- Component city
- City of Malaybalay
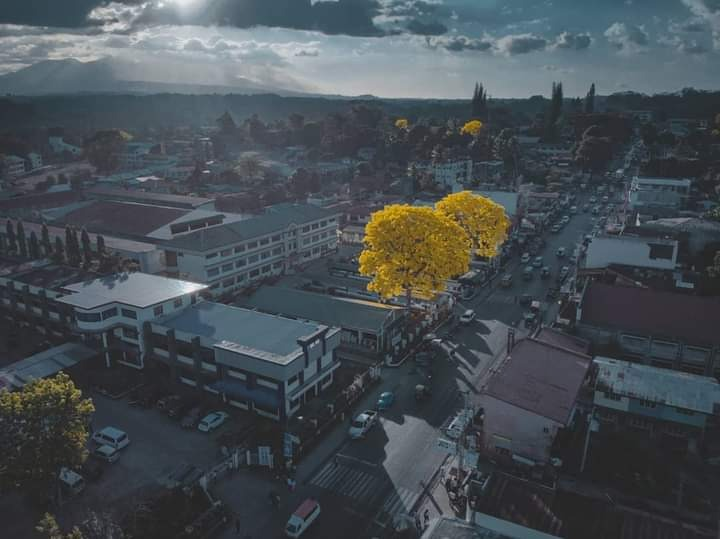
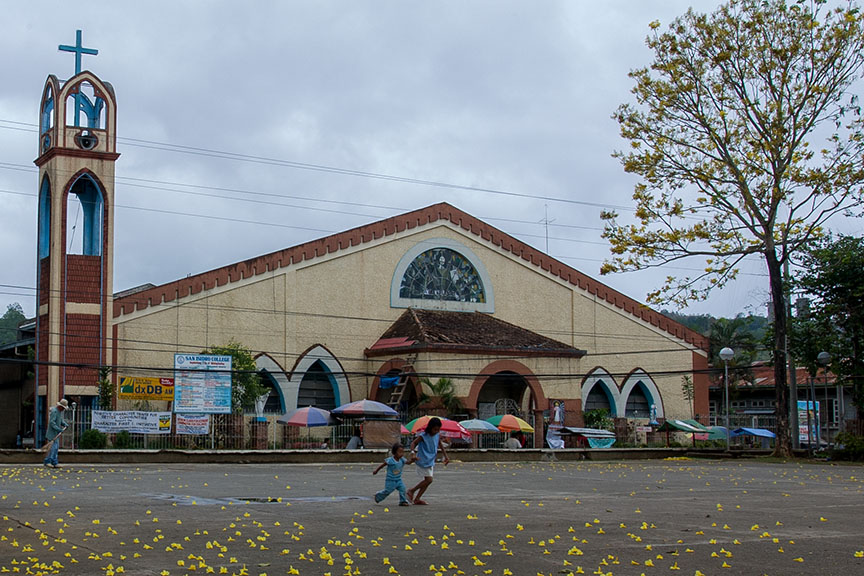
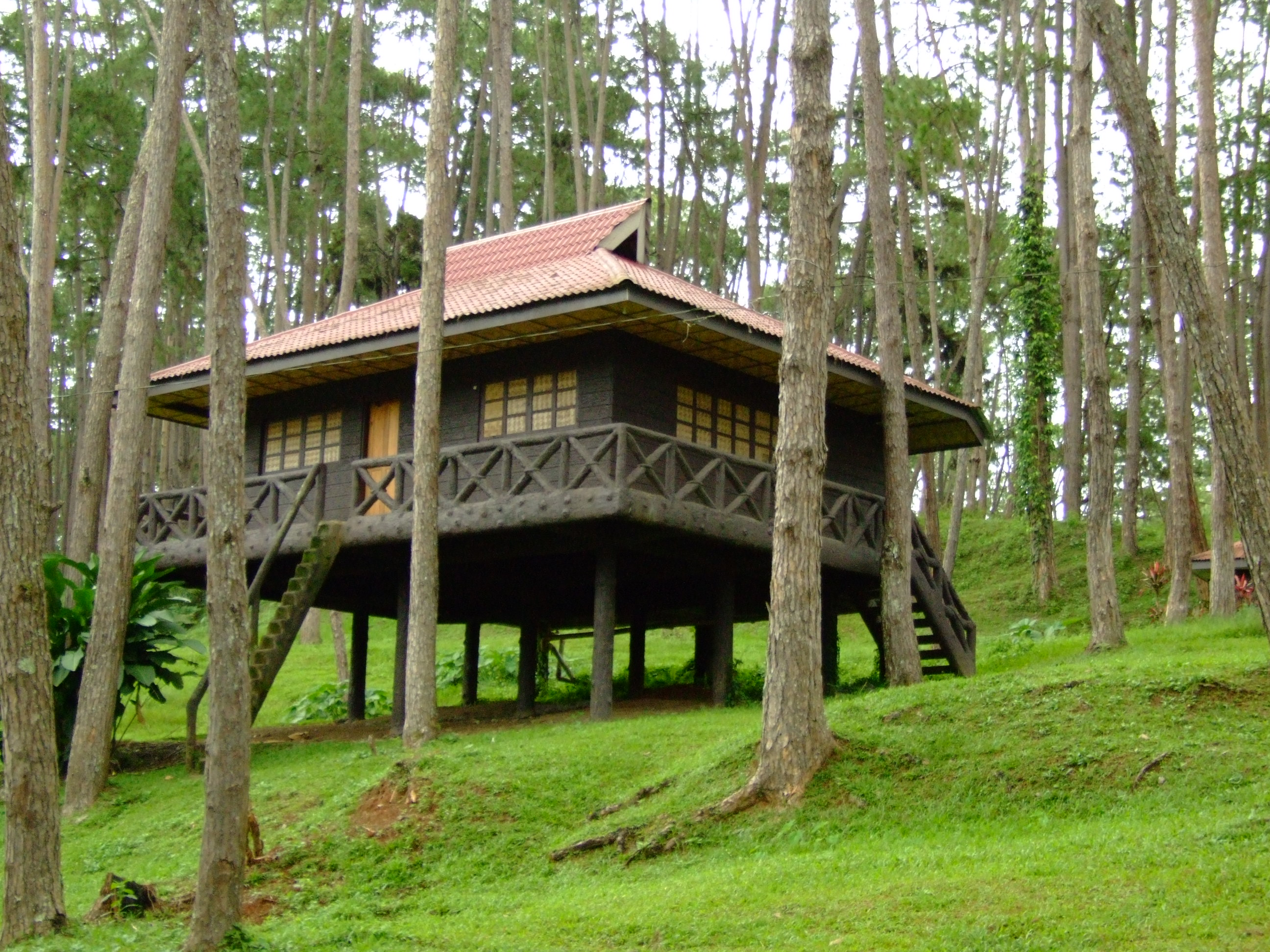
- Skyline of Malaybalay Malaybalay City Hall Abbey of the Transfiguration Malaybalay City Rizal Park San Isidro Labrador Cathedral Kaamulan Grounds

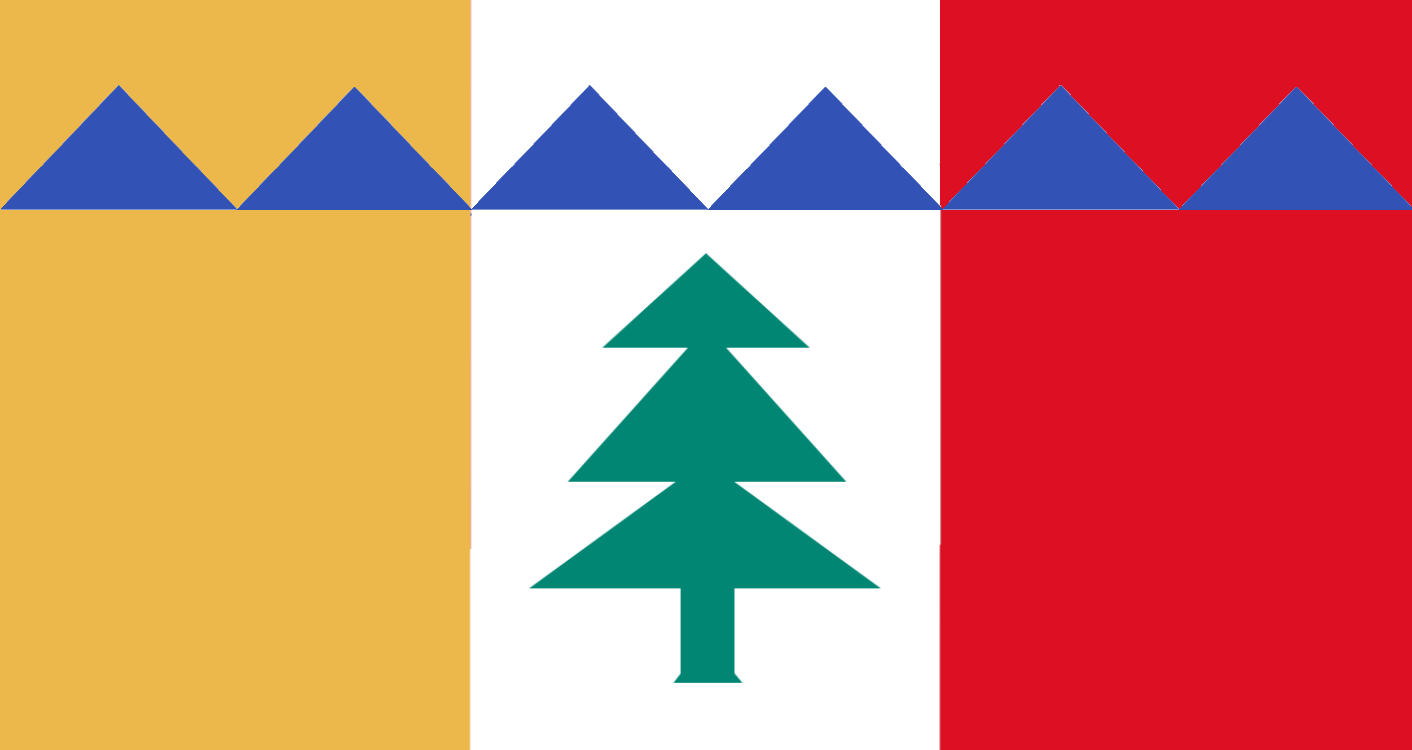
- Flag Seal Wordmark
- Nicknames: "South Summer Capital of the Philippines" (Note: Shared with Marawi, Lanao del Sur); "City in the Forest of the South"
- Motto(s): "Cool Place, Warm People"
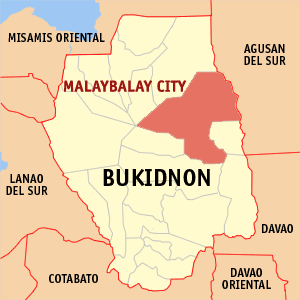
- Map of Bukidnon with Malaybalay highlighted
- Interactive map of Malaybalay
- Location within the Philippines
- Coordinates: 8°09′23″N 125°08′00″E
- Country: Philippines
- Region: Northern Mindanao
- Province: Bukidnon
- District: 2nd district
- Founded: 15 June 1877
- Cityhood: 22 March 1998
- Barangays: 46 (see Barangays)

Government
  - Type: Sangguniang Panlungsod
  - Mayor: Jay Warren R. Pabillaran
  - Vice Mayor: Estelito R. Marabe
  - Representative: Jonathan Keith T. Flores
  - City Council: Members: Niko P. Aldeguer; Brian Nelson T. Flores; Melchor P. Maramara; Zoltan Dindo D. Dinlayan; Kathleen Cecille C. Pagaling; Cromwell Kiril D. Dinlayan; Royland M. Orquia; Erwin A. Damasco; Christopher B. Soria; Alan Ryann O. Legaspi; Julius N. Manghano ( ABC Pres); Renato S. Sumbongan (IPMR); Christopher L. Tortola (SK Fed )
  - Electorate: 124,813 voters (2025)

Area
  - Total: 969.19 km^{2} (374.21 sq mi)
- Elevation: 828 m (2,717 ft)
- Highest elevation (Mount Dulang-dulang): 2,941 m (9,649 ft)
- Lowest elevation (Sawaga River): 315 m (1,033 ft)

Population (2024 census)
  - Total: 195,046
  - Density: 201.25/km^{2} (521.23/sq mi)
  - Households: 43,839

Economy
  - Income class: 1st city income class
  - Poverty incidence: 22.92% (2023)
  - Revenue: ₱ 2,246 million (2024)
  - Assets: ₱ 5,805 million (2024)
  - Expenditure: ₱ 2,080 million (2024)

Service provider
  - Electricity: Bukidnon 2 Electric Cooperative (BUSECO)
- Time zone: UTC+8 (PST)
- ZIP code: 8700
- PSGC: 101312000
- IDD : area code: +63 (0)88
- Native languages: Binukid; Cebuano
- Website: malaybalaycity.gov.ph

Malaybalay, officially the City of Malaybalay (Binukid: Bánuwa ta Malaybaláy; Cebuano: Siyudad sa Malaybalay), is a component city and capital of the province of Bukidnon, Philippines. According to the 2024 census, it has a population of 195,046 people.

The city, dubbed as the "South Summer Capital of the Philippines", is bordered north by Impasugong; west by Lantapan; south by Valencia and San Fernando; and east by Cabanglasan and Agusan del Sur.

It was formerly part of the province of Misamis Oriental as a municipal district in the late 19th century. When the special province of Agusan (now Agusan del Norte and Agusan del Sur) and its sub-province (Bukidnon) were created in 1907, Malaybalay was designated as the capital of Bukidnon. It was then formally established as a municipality on October 19, 1907, and was created into a city on February 11, 1998, by virtue of Republic Act 8490.

Malaybalay City is the venue of the Kaamulan Festival, held annually from mid-February to March 10.

== Etymology ==
According to the anthropologist and historian Ludivina Opeña, the name Malaybalay in historical records can be traced to the name of a spring (salubsob or salebseb in the Manobo languages) along the Sawaga River. The original meaning is unknown. The name is often incorrectly given baseless folk etymologies due to its resemblance to Cebuano words.

== History ==
Historiographic accounts for Malaybalay are scarce, and conflicting narratives further obscure the actual history of the city due to the oral nature of passing information by the Indigenous peoples and the incomplete accounts of Spanish registries in the region.

=== Precolonial history ===
Malaybalay is one of the few villages in central Mindanao that was founded by the natives. People who live in present-day Malaybalay and most of Northern Mindanao and parts of Caraga now call themselves Higaonon. Higaonon tribal chieftains claim a city was built at the confluence (sabangán) of the Kibalabag and Can-ayan Rivers, at which point the Tagoloan River begins and is considered a sacred place by the tribe. They never converted to Islam like the tribes in Cotabato and Lanao.

=== Spanish period, 17th to 19th century ===
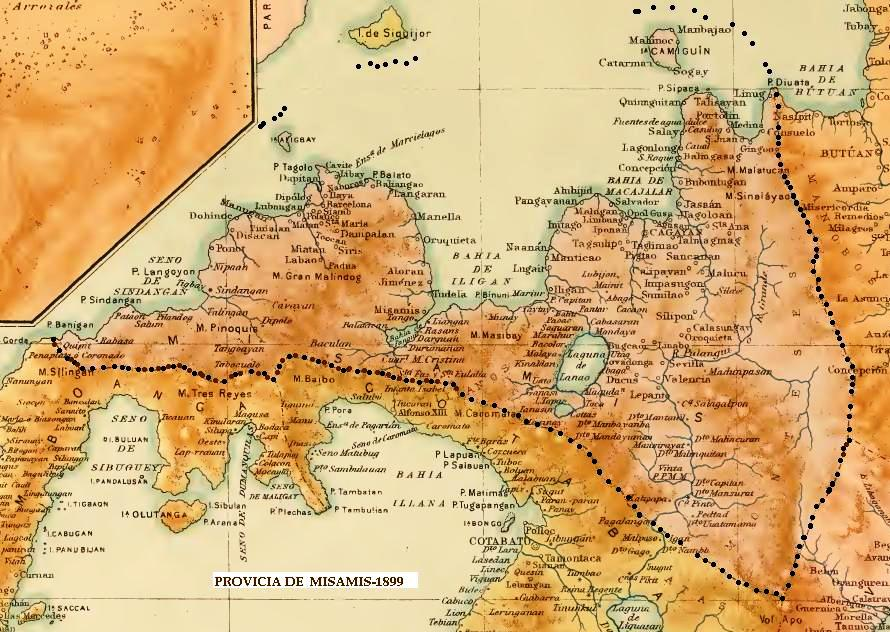
Map of Misamis Province, 1899

The Spanish, who arrived in the area in the 18th century, already saw thriving communities along the Tagoloan River. In 1815, the province of Misamis was created, which included areas of present-day Bukidnon. However, some skirmishes with the Spanish administration existed, such as the burning of Kalasungay village in 1850 by Spanish authorities, although the cause of such incident is conflicting. Nonetheless, it dispersed the survivors into neighboring villages such as Silae and Silipon (now Dalwangan). A group established a new settlement near the Sacub River (a spring near present-day Rizal Park), led by Datù Mampaalong. On June 15, 1877, in an accord between the Spanish government and Mampaalong with 30 other datù, their settlement called Malaybalay was incorporated into Misamis. At the same event, Mampaalong and his people embraced Christianity. Spanish registries incorporated Malaybalay as the pueblo Oroquieta, in the town of Sevilla (now Mailag), administered by the clergy. Other settlements, namely Kalasungay (Calasungay), Linabo, Silae, Valencia, Bugcaon, Alanib (Covadonga), Monserrat (may refer to either Lumbayao or Lurugan), and Lepanto (may refer to Maramag) were also incorporated into the town in separate occasions. Although Mailag was the designated town proper by the Spanish government, it was Linabo that served as the seat of town government. Malaybalay was then a barrio headed by an appointed cabeza de barangay.

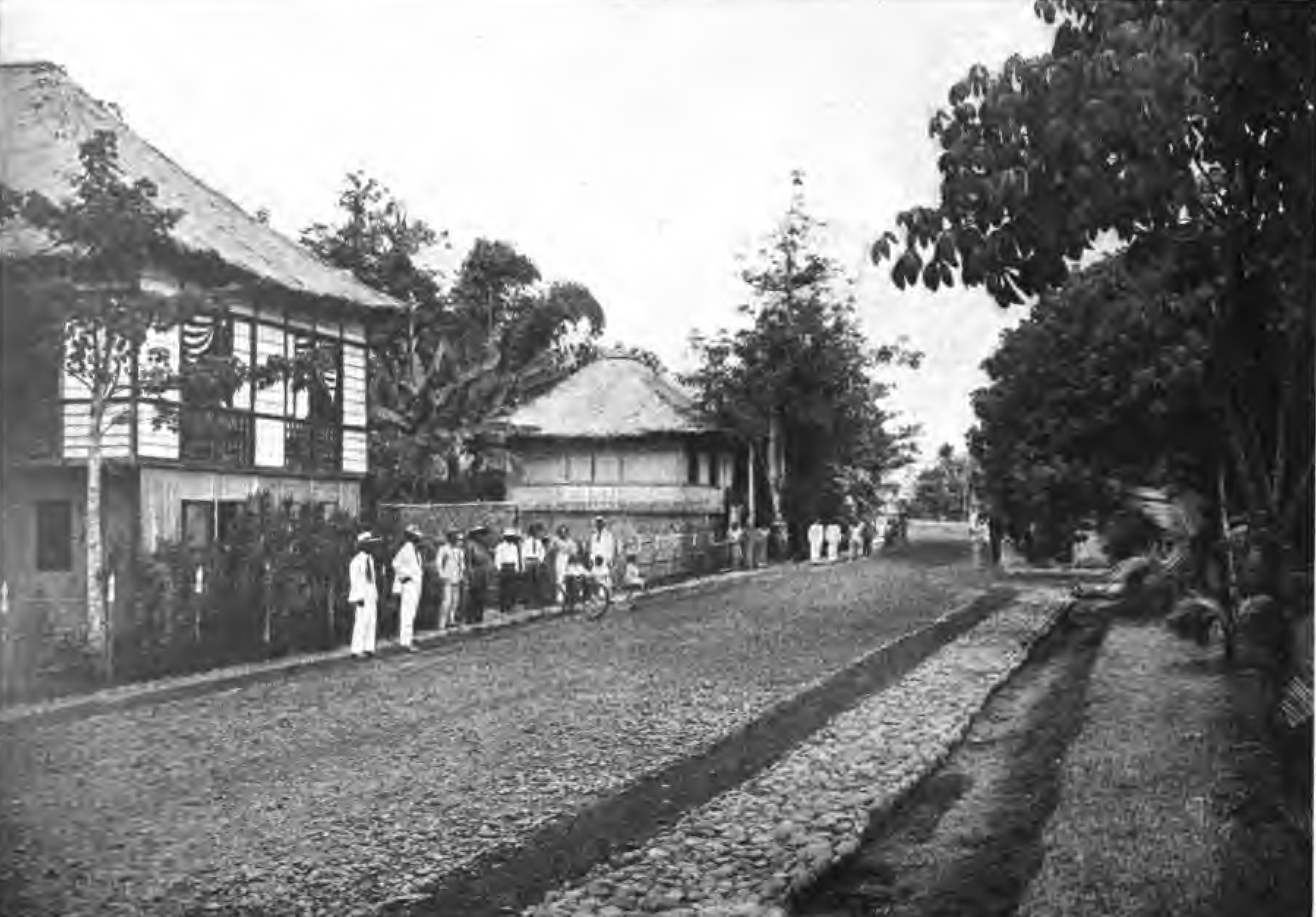
A street in Malaybalay in 1917

=== American occupation, 1898-1946 ===
During the American occupation, administrative structure of Mindanao underwent complete overhaul. The Province of Misamis was dissolved forming the current provinces of Misamis Occidental and Misamis Oriental. Likewise, the Philippine Commission then headed by Commissioner Dean C. Worcester, Secretary of Interior and a member of the Philippine Commission proposed the creation of a province of Bukidnon. With it, the local administration of Sevilla was considered defunct.

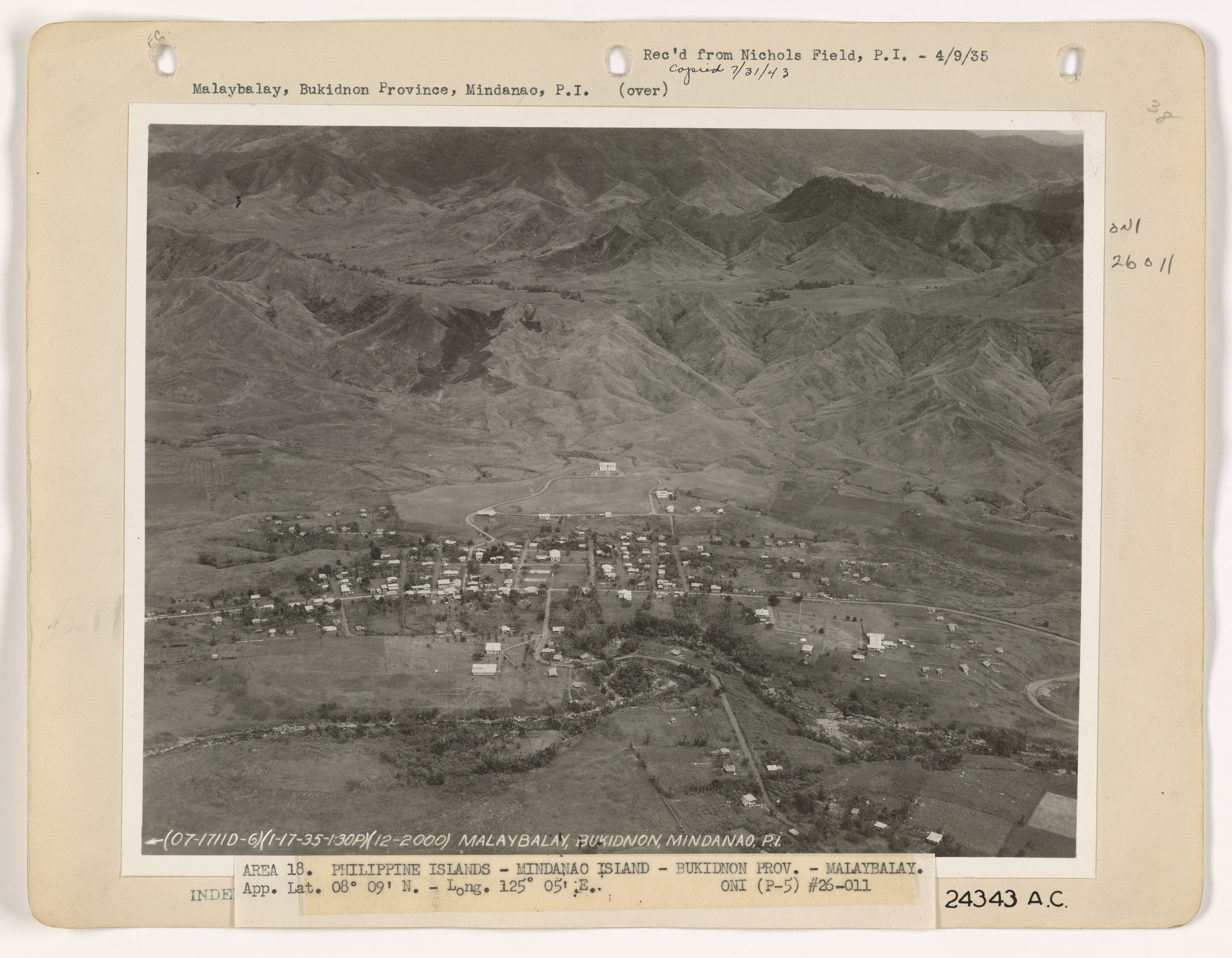
Aerial view of Malaybalay, 1935

On August 20, 1907, the Philippine Commission Act No. 1693 was enacted creating the sub-province of Bukidnon. Malaybalay was then formally created as a municipality on October 19, 1907, replacing Mailag. It included the barrios of the former Sevilla except for Maramag, which became a separate Municipality. Dalwangan, formerly a village under Sumilao during the Spanish administration, was also incorporated within Malaybalay. When Bukidnon was declared as a regular province and become an independent political unit on March 10, 1917, by virtue of the creation of the Department of Mindanao and Sulu under Act 2711, Malaybalay was designated as its provincial capital.

=== World War II and Japanese occupation, 1942-1945 ===
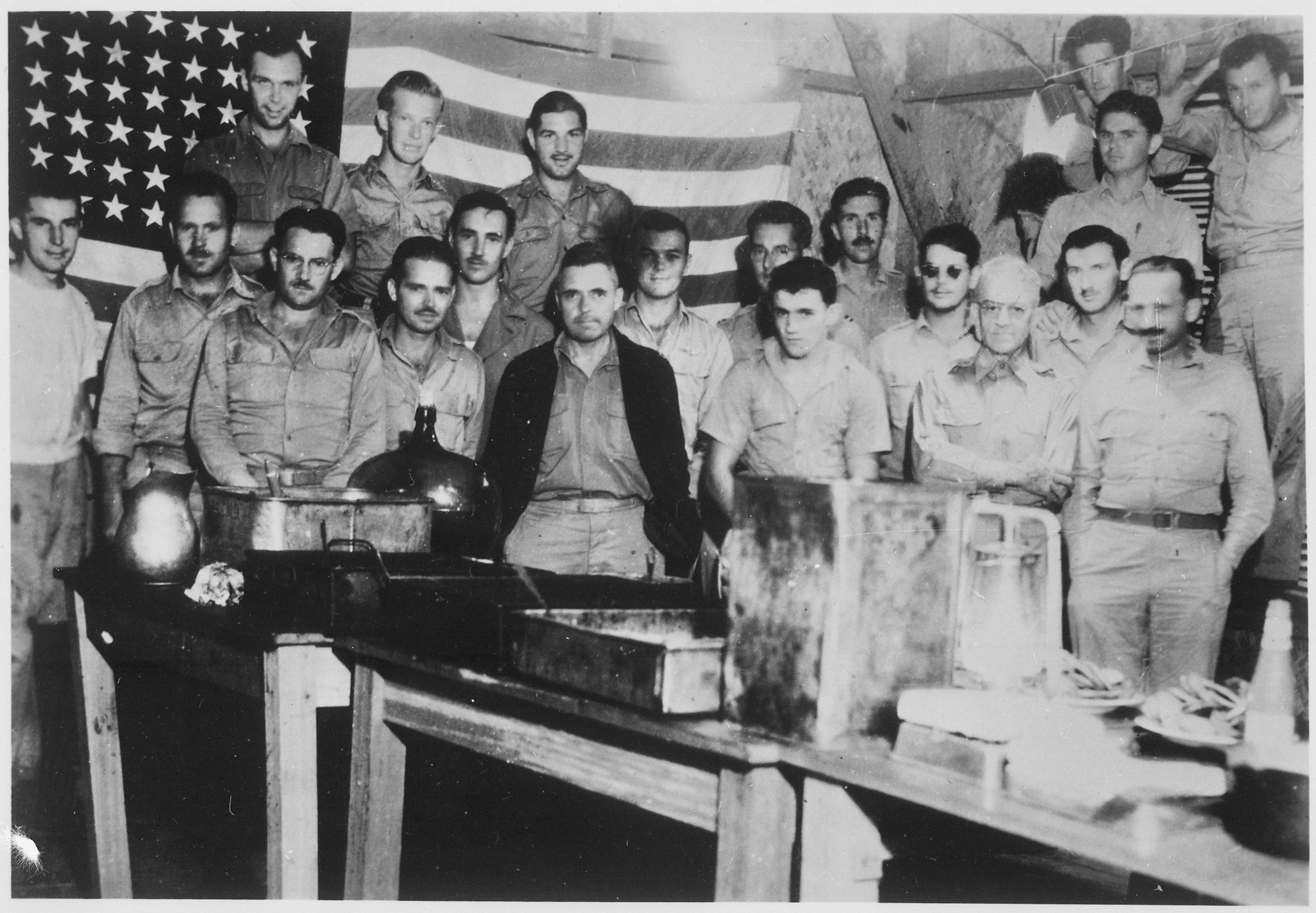
American prisoners of war celebrate the 4th of July in the Japanese prison camp of Casisang in Malaybalay.

During the Second World War, in 1942, the Japanese occupation troops entered Bukidnon. They occupied Malaybalay, establishing a camp in Casisang. Guerrilla groups operating around Malaybalay made frequent raids on the Japanese camps from the time of the occupation until the arrival of the Americans. In 1945 American liberation forces, together with the Philippine Commonwealth Forces and Filipino guerrillas, liberated Malaybalay.

=== Postwar Malaybalay ===
Malaybalay was one of the few municipalities and municipal districts comprising Bukidnon and in the decades that followed, several municipalities were created from Malaybalay's far-flung but populous barangays. These municipalities eventually became San Fernando (1959, from 8 barrios), Valencia (1961, from 13 barrios), Lantapan (1968, from 12 barrios), and Cabanglasan (1979, from 15 barrios). As the capital town, most economic activity was centered here until it shifted to the more centrally located Valencia, its daughter town. In 1980, Valencia overtook Malaybalay as the most populous municipality.

=== Cityhood ===
On March 26, 1996, the Sangguniang Bayan of the municipality of Malaybalay passed Resolution No. 3699-96 petitioning to the House of Representatives for the conversion of Malaybalay into a city. Reginaldo Tilanduca, 2nd District Representative of Bukidnon at that time, filed House Bill No. 6275, proposing the creation of Malaybalay into a component city. On March 22, 1998, President Fidel Ramos signed the act (R.A. 8490) that converted Malaybalay to a city, making it the first component city of Bukidnon.

== Geography ==
Malaybalay, the capital city of Bukidnon, is in the central part of the province. It is bounded in the east by the municipality of Cabanglasan and the Pantaron Range, which separates Bukidnon from the provinces of Agusan del Sur and Davao del Norte; on the west by the municipality of Lantapan and Mount Kitanglad; on the north by the municipality of Impasugong; and on the south by Valencia City and the municipality of San Fernando.

The whole eastern and southeastern border adjoining Agusan del Sur and Davao del Norte is elevated and densely forested mountains, which is one of the few remaining forest blocks of Mindanao. The nearest seaports and airports are in Cagayan de Oro, which is 91 kilometers away.

=== Barangays ===
Malaybalay is politically subdivided into 46 barangays. Each barangay consists of puroks while some have sitios.

These barangays are conveniently grouped into 5 geographical districts, namely the Poblacion District, North Highway District, South Highway District, Basakan District, and Upper Pulangi District.

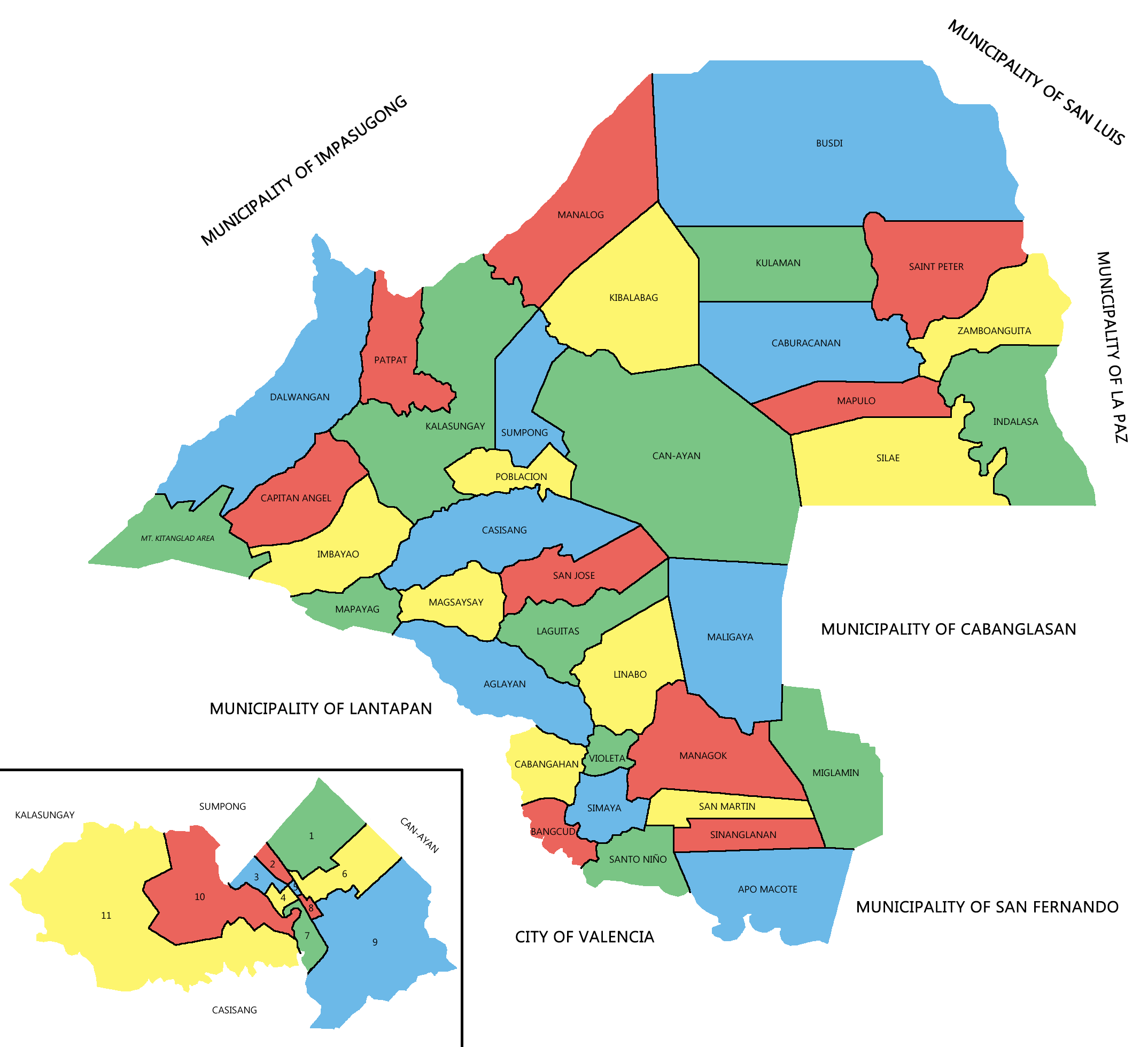
Political map of Malaybalay showing the 46 barangays under its jurisdiction. Poblacion district is enlarged below left. All boundaries are approximate and are not authoritative.

Barangay	Geographic district	Classification (Urban/Rural)	Population	
Barangay	Geographic district	Classification (Urban/Rural)	2020	2015
Barangay 1	Poblacion	Urban	6,442 ▲	5,293
Barangay 2	Poblacion	Urban	587 ▼	969
Barangay 3	Poblacion	Urban	438 ▼	788
Barangay 4	Poblacion	Urban	344 ▼	456
Barangay 5	Poblacion	Urban	71 ▼	186
Barangay 6	Poblacion	Urban	474 ▼	741
Barangay 7	Poblacion	Urban	1,891 ▼	2,298
Barangay 8	Poblacion	Urban	579 ▼	675
Barangay 9	Poblacion	Urban	9,187 ▲	9,022
Barangay 10 (Impalambong)	Poblacion	Urban	3,447 ▲	2,942
Barangay 11 (Impalambong)	Poblacion	Rural	3,034 ▼	3,209
Aglayan	South Highway	Urban	8,215 ▲	7,594
Apo Macote	Basakan	Urban	5,024 ▲	4,903
Bangcud	South Highway	Urban	5,771 ▲	5,111
Busdi	Upper Pulangi	Rural	2,644 ▲	2,377
Cabangahan	South Highway	Rural	3,162 ▲	3,015
Caburacanan	Upper Pulangi	Rural	1,130 ▼	1,150
Can-ayan	North Highway	Urban	6,553 ▲	5,870
Capitan Angel	North Highway	Rural	1,545 ▲	1,160
Casisang	South Highway	Urban	29,406 ▲	25,696
Dalwangan	North Highway	Urban	7,785 ▲	7,004
Imbayao	North Highway	Urban	1,817 ▼	1,833
Indalasa	Upper Pulangi	Rural	1,979 ▲	1,690
Kalasungay	North Highway	Urban	9,961 ▲	8,272
Kibalabag	North Highway	Rural	1,199 ▲	1,158
Kulaman	Upper Pulangi	Rural	1,291 ▼	1,341
Laguitas	South Highway	Urban	3,899 ▲	3,233
Linabo	Basakan	Urban	7,448 ▲	6,933
Magsaysay	South Highway	Rural	3,176 ▲	3,001
Maligaya	Basakan	Rural	2,413 ▲	2,113
Managok	Basakan	Urban	7,567 ▲	7,200
Manalog	North Highway	Rural	1,035 ▲	969
Mapayag	South Highway	Rural	1,045 ▲	979
Mapulo	Upper Pulangi	Rural	1,675 ▲	1,260
Miglamin	Basakan	Rural	2,596 ▼	3,188
Patpat	North Highway	Rural	4,366 ▲	3,833
Saint Peter	Upper Pulangi	Rural	2,817 ▲	2,324
San Jose	South Highway	Urban	9,213 ▲	6,856
San Martin	Basakan	Rural	3,326 ▲	3,088
Santo Niño	Basakan	Rural	1,845 ▲	1,675
Silae	Upper Pulangi	Rural	2,681 ▲	2,629
Simaya	Basakan	Rural	4,713 ▲	4,161
Sinanglanan	Basakan	Rural	3,644 ▲	3,262
Sumpong	North Highway	Urban	9,243 ▼	9,302
Violeta	Basakan	Rural	2,269 ▲	2,199
Zamboanguita	Upper Pulangi	Rural	1,765 ▲	1,667
Total			190,712▲	174,625

=== Climate ===
The climate classification of Malaybalay falls under the Fourth Type or intermediate B type, which is characterized by the absence of a pronounced maximum period and dry season. Rain falls at a yearly average of 2,800 millimeters (110 in) and occurs throughout the year, though it is more intense during the summer season from April to September. Outside these months, January to March receive less rain and October to December are intermediate. Compared with the rest of the country, the climate in Malaybalay is moderate all year round and the area is not on the typhoon belt.

Climate data for Malaybalay, Bukidnon (1991–2020, extremes 1949–present)
Month	Jan	Feb	Mar	Apr	May	Jun	Jul	Aug	Sep	Oct	Nov	Dec	Year
Record high °C (°F)	34.4 (93.9)	35.2 (95.4)	35.5 (95.9)	37.5 (99.5)	36.4 (97.5)	34.5 (94.1)	33.5 (92.3)	34.0 (93.2)	34.0 (93.2)	34.0 (93.2)	35.0 (95.0)	33.6 (92.5)	37.5 (99.5)
Mean daily maximum °C (°F)	29.1 (84.4)	29.7 (85.5)	30.7 (87.3)	31.6 (88.9)	31.1 (88.0)	29.9 (85.8)	29.1 (84.4)	29.2 (84.6)	29.5 (85.1)	29.8 (85.6)	30.1 (86.2)	29.8 (85.6)	30.0 (86.0)
Daily mean °C (°F)	23.5 (74.3)	23.6 (74.5)	24.2 (75.6)	25.0 (77.0)	25.2 (77.4)	24.6 (76.3)	24.0 (75.2)	24.0 (75.2)	24.1 (75.4)	24.3 (75.7)	24.3 (75.7)	24.0 (75.2)	24.2 (75.6)
Mean daily minimum °C (°F)	17.9 (64.2)	17.6 (63.7)	17.7 (63.9)	18.3 (64.9)	19.2 (66.6)	19.2 (66.6)	19.0 (66.2)	18.9 (66.0)	18.8 (65.8)	18.8 (65.8)	18.5 (65.3)	18.3 (64.9)	18.5 (65.3)
Record low °C (°F)	11.7 (53.1)	10.0 (50.0)	12.0 (53.6)	12.5 (54.5)	14.0 (57.2)	13.0 (55.4)	14.0 (57.2)	15.0 (59.0)	15.3 (59.5)	14.9 (58.8)	13.1 (55.6)	12.5 (54.5)	10.0 (50.0)
Average rainfall mm (inches)	174.8 (6.88)	112.8 (4.44)	104.1 (4.10)	118.3 (4.66)	240.1 (9.45)	319.5 (12.58)	350.2 (13.79)	300.7 (11.84)	290.8 (11.45)	292.1 (11.50)	177.6 (6.99)	160.9 (6.33)	2,641.9 (104.01)
Average rainy days (≥ 1 mm)	14	10	10	10	17	20	21	19	20	19	15	14	189
Average relative humidity (%)	86	84	82	81	84	87	88	88	88	87	86	86	86
Source: PAGASA

=== Land area ===
The total land area of the city is 96,919 hectares (239,490 acres), that is about 13% of the total area of Bukidnon. An estimated 65% of this is classified as forestland/timberland and the remaining 35% is alienable and disposable areas: lands which could be used for purposes such as for agriculture or for industry.

The city plays a strategic role in the protection of the headwater source of the Pulangi and the Tagoloan rivers because of its location the upper portion of both watershed areas. The Pulangi River then extends through the Cotabato provinces as the Rio Grande de Mindanao and to Cotabato City, where it empties into Illana Bay. The Tagoloan River, on the other hand, traverses northwestward toward Tagoloan, Misamis Oriental, where it joins Macajalar Bay. These watershed areas provided potable water, irrigation, hydro-electric power, and recreation and tourism activities.

=== Topography and soil type ===
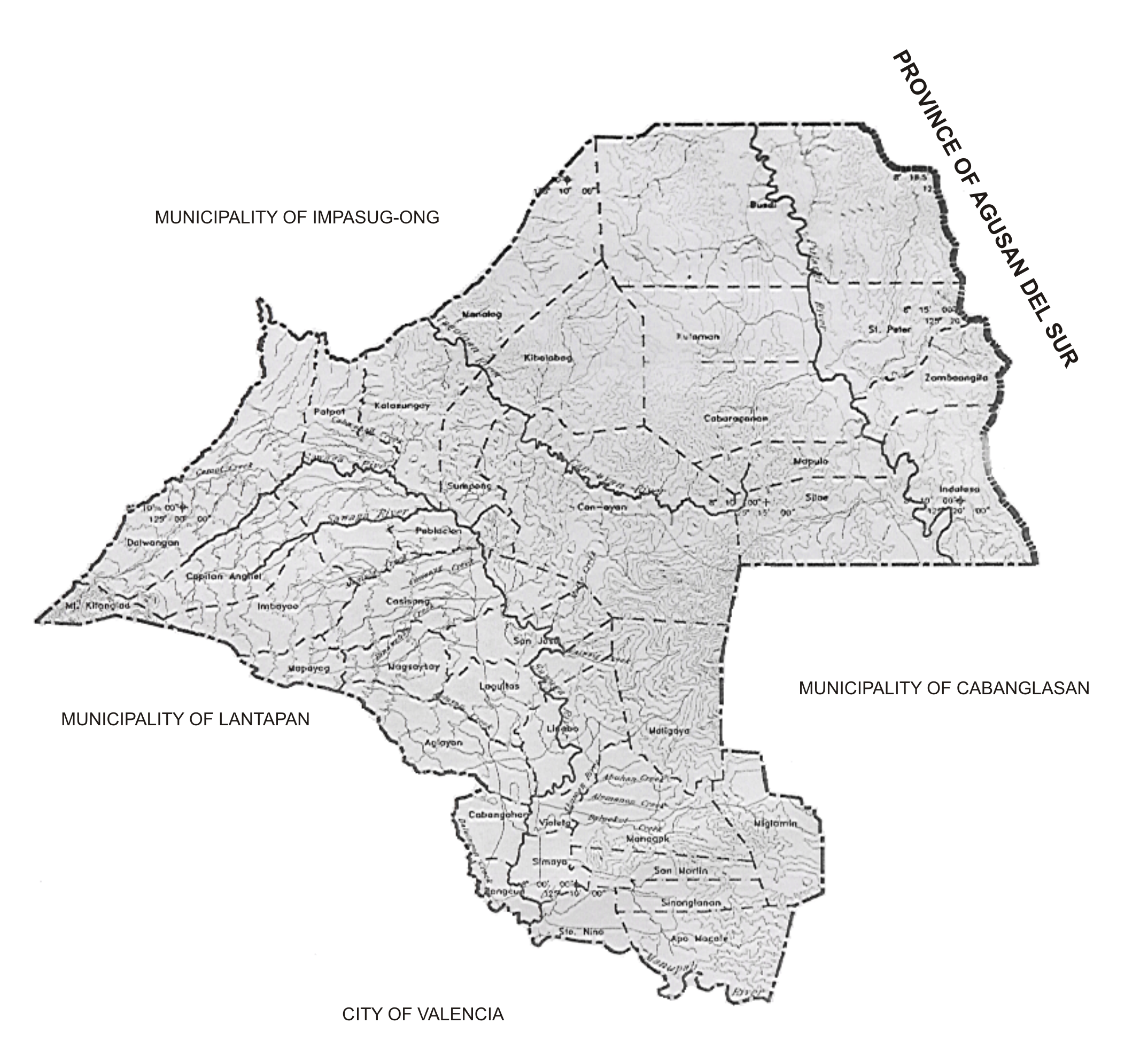
Topographic map of Malaybalay

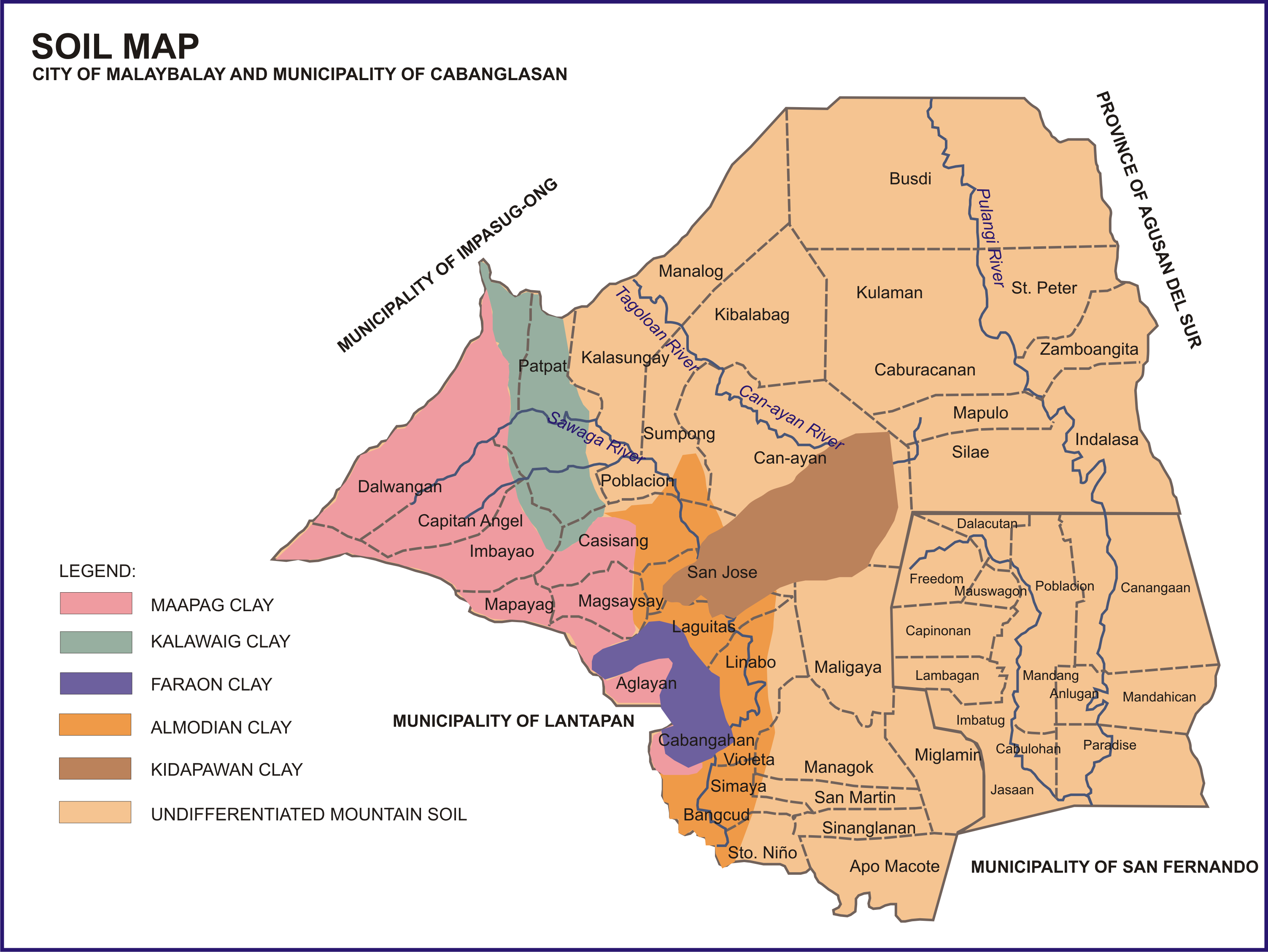
Soil map of Malaybalay

The average elevation of the city is 622 metres (2,041 ft) above sea level. About 60% of the city's area has above 30% slope, characterized by steep hills, mountains, and cliff-like stream side. About 25% are level, gently sloping, and undulating. The rest are rolling and hilly.

One of prominent geographical structure in the city is the Kitanglad Mountain Range, located in the western frontier, on its border with Lantapan and Impasugong. Some barangays (Dalwangan, Capitan Bayong, Imbayao and Mampayag) are in the foothills of this mountain range. Steep hills are found in the central portion of the city (Kibalabag, Manalog and Can-ayan), where the Tagoloan River headwater can be found. The Central Mindanao Cordillera (Pantaron Mountain Range), is on the eastern side of the city, in its boundaries with Agusan del Sur province. The Pulangi River cuts across the area between the hills in the central part and the Central Cordillera in the eastern part, creating a portion of the Upper Pulangi river valley. The southern portion of the city is made up of level to undulating area, a river valley created by the Sawaga River and the Manupali River, which are both tributaries of the Pulangi River.

About 66% of the city's soil is identified as undifferentiated mountain soil and the rest are clay. The predominant types of clay are Kidapawan, Alimodian and Adtuyon, which are generally good for agriculture.

== Demography ==
Population census of Malaybalay
Year	Pop.	±% p.a.
1918	16,428	—
1939	18,816	+0.65%
1948	16,458	−1.48%
1960	32,522	+5.84%
1970	47,074	+3.76%
1975	65,198	+6.75%
1980	60,779	−1.39%
1990	94,722	+4.54%
1995	112,277	+3.24%
2000	123,672	+2.09%
2007	144,065	+2.13%
2010	153,085	+2.23%
2015	174,625	+2.54%
2020	190,712	+1.87%
2024	195,046	+0.54%
Source: Philippine Statistics Authority

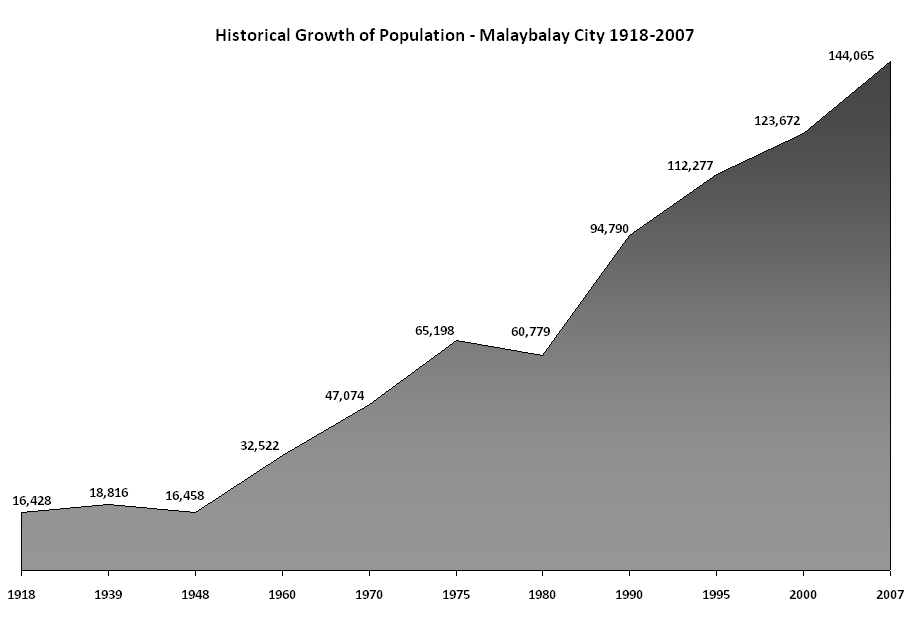
Historical growth of population of Malaybalay, 1918–2007

Malaybalay is originally the home of the Bukidnon "lumads" or natives, but there has been an influx of settlers and immigrants from the Visayas and Luzon for the last four decades contributing to the growth of the population. The original inhabitants, the Bukidnons, have retreated to the hinterlands as the migrants continued to occupy and dominate the population centers in the city. Malaybalay is the second most populous political subdivision in the province, after Valencia.

The historical growth of population of the city showed a variable pattern of growth (See Figure). The first census of population was made in 1918 with Malaybalay having only 16,428 inhabitants. The 21 years from 1918 to 1939 was a low-growth period with the city's population growing at a 0.6% annually. This was then followed by a period of population decline until the post-World War II era, declining by 1.5% per year. The 12-year period from 1948 to 1960 is a period of high growth, when the city's population almost doubled from its 1948 level. This pace of growth continued until 1970, growing 6.7%. In 1970, Malaybalay has 65,918 inhabitants. A 5-year period of declining growth followed, the population dropped to 60,779. After the decline, Malaybalay's population has been increasing since then, growing by 3.4% from 1990 to 1995 and by 1.9% from 1995 to 2000.

The city is predominantly rural, with only 16% of the population in urban areas, 40% in urbanizing barangays and 46% in rural areas. Population is evenly distributed in the urban and rural areas. The urban areas are generally found on the confines of the Sayre Highway (also known in the city as "Fortich Street") that traverses the city. The main urban population is found in the Poblacion-Casisang-Sumpong area. Secondary population centers includes barangays Aglayan, Bangcud, Kalasungay and San Jose.

Malaybalay has one of the lowest average population density in the province, second only to Impasug-ong with only 146 persons per square kilometer although there are barangays, especially in the Poblacion area, with high population density.

=== Languages ===
Cebuano and Binukid are prevailing mediums of communication in the city. More than half of the city's population are speakers of these languages. Hiligaynon is also spoken by the descendants of the Hiligaynon (Ilonggo) settlers in the city. Then there is also a significant Maranao-speaking Muslim community, especially in the city center and business trading places.

=== Religion ===
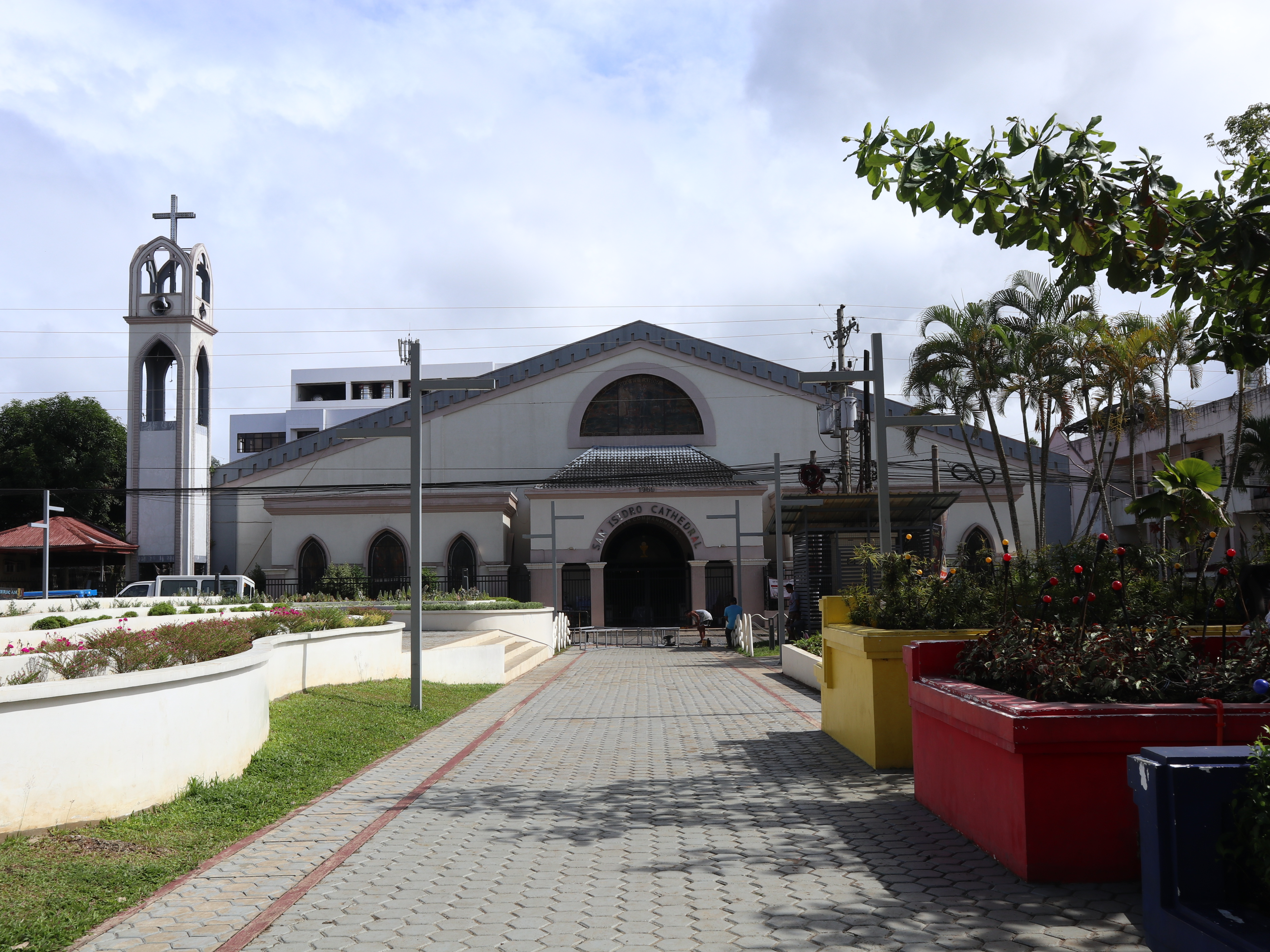
San Isidro Labrador Cathedral

The majority of the population follow Christianity, with Roman Catholicism as the largest denomination. Other sizeable Christian denominations include Baptists, Evangelicals, Seventh-Day Adventists, Iglesia ni Cristo, Latter-Day Saints, Methodists, Jehovah's Witnesses, and Aglipayans. The largest non-Christian religion in the city is Islam, whose members are concentrated throughout Barangay 9, Casisang, and San Jose. There is a small presence of Buddhism in the city typically practiced by immigrants.

==== Roman Catholicism ====
Malaybalay is the center of the Diocese of Malaybalay which covers the province of Bukidnon (except for the municipality of Malitbog which is under the Archdiocese of Cagayan de Oro), the municipality of Wao, Lanao del Sur, and Barangay Buda in Davao City. It covers an area of 8, 294 square kilometers. San Isidro the Farmer Cathedral is the largest church in the city which is located beside Plaza Rizal.

==== Other Christians ====
Baptists comprise the majority of the population in Busdi, Caburacanan, Can-ayan, Kibalabag, Kulaman, and Manalog due to the active missionary work in the mentioned areas. Malaybalay is designated as the center of ecclesiastical organizations of other denominations in Bukidnon. For example, the Philippine Independent Church places the entire province into the Diocese of Malaybalay. The Church of Jesus Christ of Latter-Day Saints organizes Malaybalay into three wards under the Malaybalay Philippines Stake, which includes the wards in Valencia, Maramag, and Quezon. In the Seventh-Day Adventist Church, Malaybalay is placed under their Central Mindanao Mission. Iglesia ni Cristo places the city as the Locale of Malaybalay under the District of Valencia City.

==== Islam ====
The remainder 23% belong to non-Christian faiths, mainly adherent of Islam. The believers of Islam are mainly Maranao, Maguindanaon, and Balik Islam (reverts to Islam). There are many mosques that can be found in the city. Malaybalay Grand Mosque is the largest mosque in the city which also serves as the Islamic Center of Bukidnon.

== Economy ==
Poverty incidence of Malaybalay

Source: Philippine Statistics Authority

Gaisano Malaybalay, Fortich Street

The city is mainly an agricultural area, and its products include rice, corn, sugarcane, vegetables, legumes, root crops and commercial crops such as rubber, coffee, banana and pineapple. During the past years, corn used to be the pre-dominant crop in the city. But as the corn areas gave way to sugarcane, agri-farms (poultry, hog), and residential areas, sugarcane (306,600 metric tons) and rice (30,318 MT) came out now as the predominant crops in terms of production volume. These products are usually sold in the local market, or in nearby municipalities of the province. There are also farmers producing larger volume of corn and rice who sell their products in Cagayan de Oro. Agri-based industries primarily poultry and piggery, now flourish in the city. These farms are assisted by big corporations such as San Miguel, Purefoods, Monterey and Swift. Other agri-based industries in the City include Asian Hybrid Philippines (feeds processing), Rubber Tex (rubber shoes manufacturing), and Monastery Farms (peanuts and other preserved foods). Also notable are the 12 cattle ranches that produce an average of 470 heads yearly.

Data from the License Department of the City showed that a majority or 95.87% of the establishments in the City belong to the service sector. Looking at the breakdown, sari-sari stores (37%) make up majority of the establishments in this sector, followed by trade/wholesale/retails (21%) and other, social and personal services (14%). Industry Sector and Agriculture Sector only make up only 2.27% and 1.9% respectively of all establishments. There is no data available on the employment per sector from the NSO that is specific for Malaybalay, thus the CPDO collected data from DTI, License Department, and City Agriculture Office to get the distribution of employment per industrial sector. The result showed that 70% of employment is in the farming/ crop production sector followed by government agencies and commercial/private establishments. Agri-industries and service sectors registered only about 1.63% and 5.99% respectively. The lowest is the manufacturing/processing sector at only 0.36%. So far 3 spring resorts, 5 plazas/nature parks have been developed in the city. Other natural sites such as forest, industrial tree plantation sites, mountains, falls, rivers and caves are still to be developed for eco-tourism.

== Culture ==
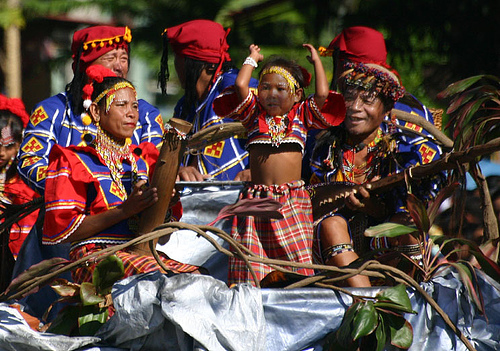
Street dancing in Kaamulan, the only authentic ethnic festival in the Philippines

Malaybalay City Charter Day
Taking place every March 22, the date is declared as a special working holiday through Republic Act 8813 as a commemoration of Malaybalay's anniversary as a chartered city. Events are lined up by the city to enable residents and visitors to come and experience the charter day activities.

Malaybalay City Fiesta
Malaybalay City Fiesta takes place every May 15 in honor of the city's patron saint, Saint Isidro Labrador, the patron of agricultural workers, labourers and livestock. The fiesta is a two-day event starting May 14, a day before the fiesta, wherein residents actively prepare for the festivities, up to fiesta day proper (May 15).

Kaamulan Festival
Kaamulan Festival is an ethnic cultural festival held annually in Malaybalay, Bukidnon in the Philippines from the second half of February to March 10, the anniversary date of the foundation of Bukidnon as a province in 1917. It is held to celebrate the culture and tradition of the seven ethnic tribal groups—Bukidnon, Higaonon, Talaandig, Manobo, Matigsalug, Tigwahanon and Umayamnon—that originally inhabit the province. It is the only ethnic festival in the Philippines.

== Tourism ==
Malaybalay has several notable tourist destinations.

The Monastery of Transfiguration in San Jose, Malaybalay City

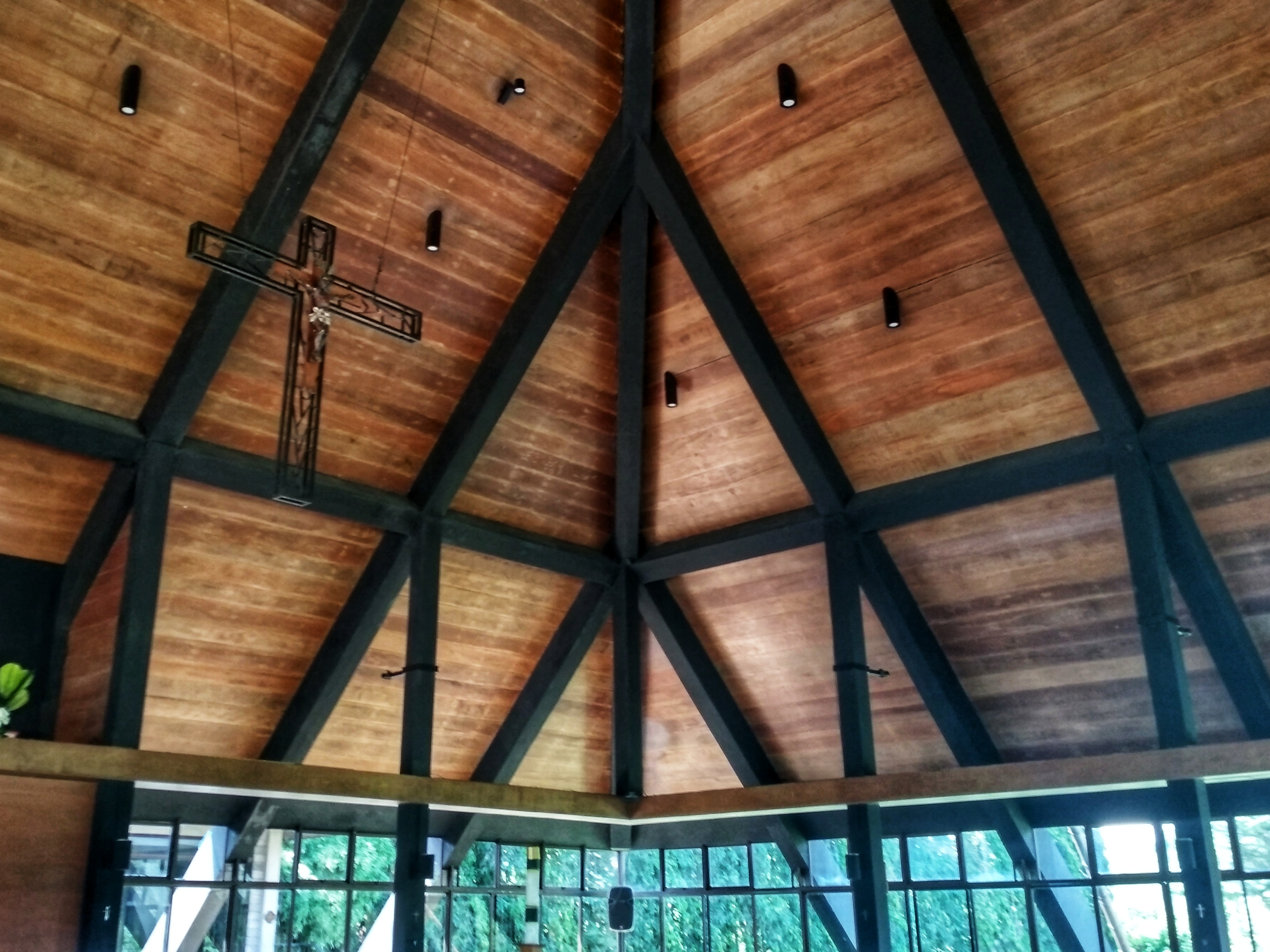
Monastery of Transfiguration interior

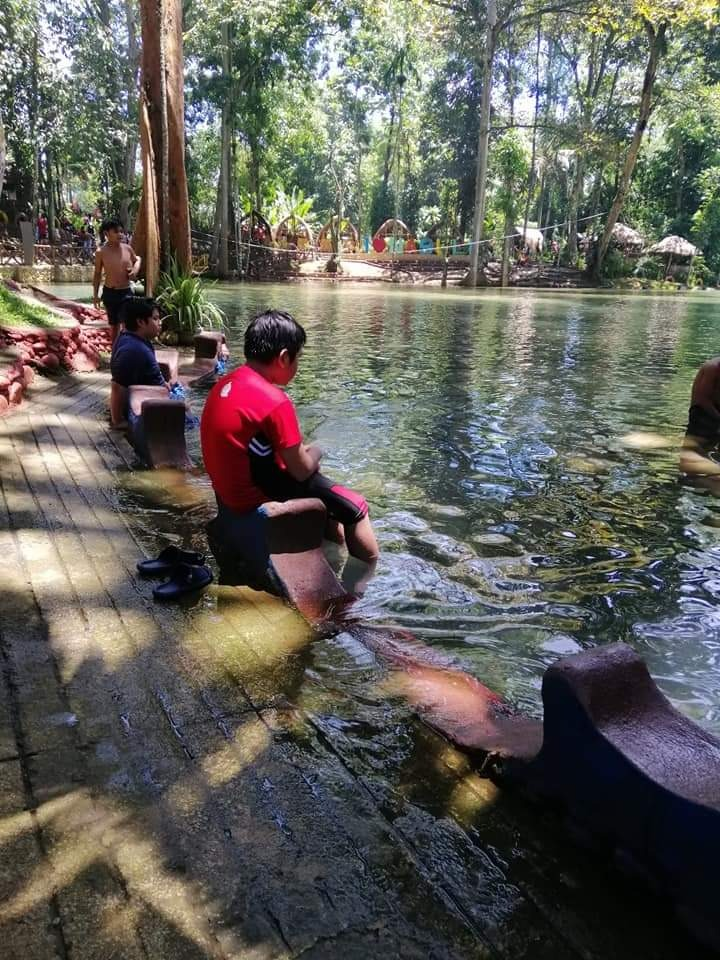
Nasuli Spring

Monastery of the Transfiguration
The city's 25-year Benedictine Monastery of Transfiguration on San Jose hill, is made of heavy lime blocks, designed by National Artist for architecture Leandro Locsin. The first Filipino Abbot, Fr. Eduardo Africa and former Malaybalay bishop Gaudencio Rosales inaugurated it on August 6, 1983. Today, 10 monks had its 7 hectares planted to rice, 25 hectares to corn, and the rest for planting the world-famous Monk's Blend Premium coffee. Its two-story Museum of Transfiguration Monastery (MTM) houses Dom Martin's 50-piece vestment collection included in Philippines' 1998 centennial celebration. The Worship and Weave book on the vestments won the 2001 National Book Award (art category).

Nasuli Spring
Located in Barangay Bangcud, this spring has blue waters deep enough for diving and swimming. It also serves as picnic grounds for families.

Bukidnon Forests Inc., (BFI) industrial tree plantation
This 39,000-hectare reforestation project (21,000 hectares of which are plantable) demonstrates the compatibility of nature with economic objectives. Funded with the assistance of the New Zealand government under the auspices of DENR, the project has been operational since 1990. The City of Malaybalay and the municipalities of Impasugong, Manolo Fortich and Malitbog are the areas covered by the plantation. Its 5-hectare nursery is capable of producing 5.2 million fast-growing seedlings every year.

Kaamulan Grounds
Located at Barangay 1, Kaamulan Grounds serves as an activity area, refuge and recollection, picnic and other outdoor activities. The Folk Arts Theater, where some provincial activities and events are held, is also found here.

Carmelite Monastery
The Carmelite Sister's Monastery is a place for retreat and prayer. It is at Pal-ing, Barangay Patpat; some 5 km from the city proper bound to the west.

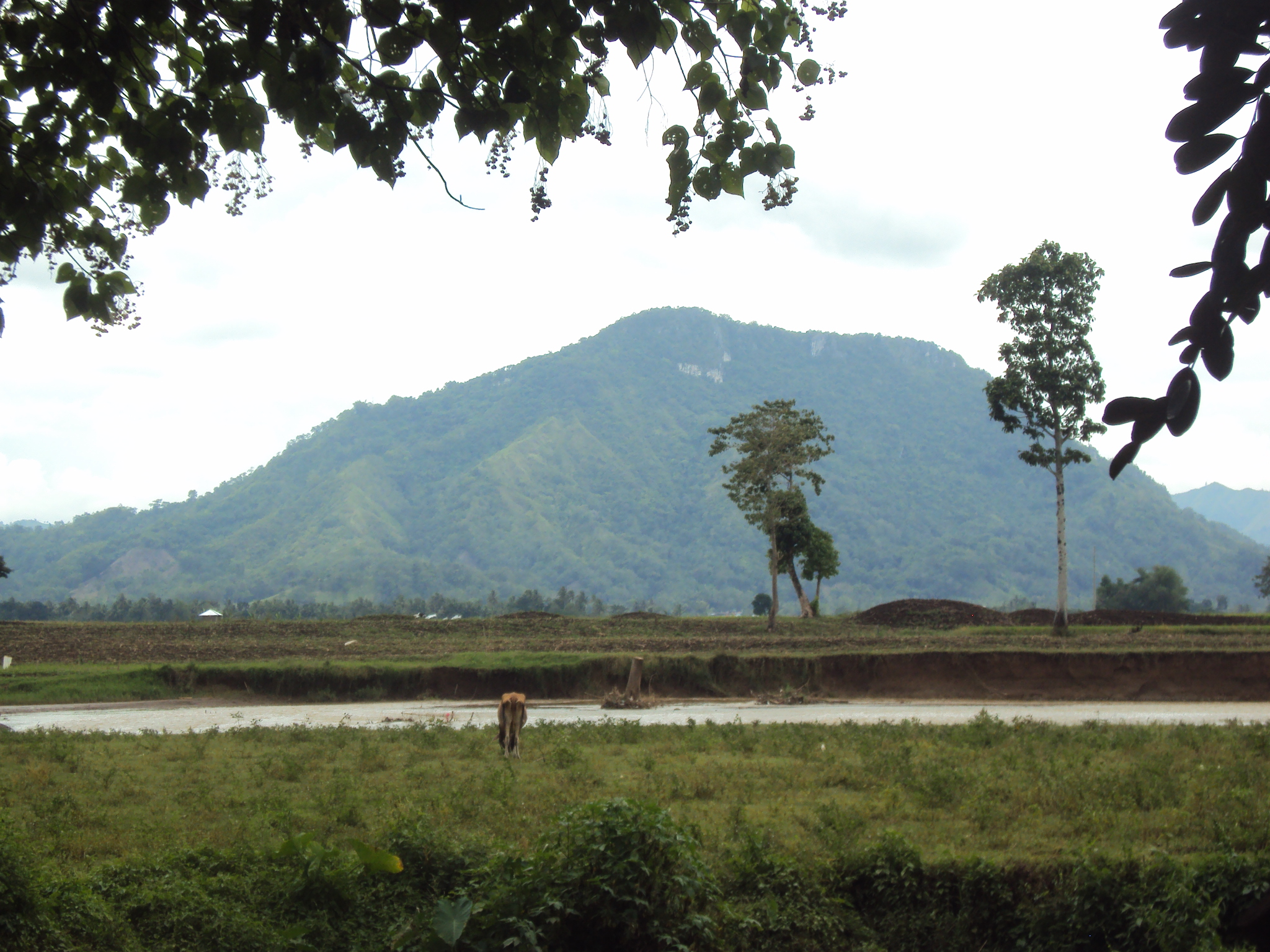
Mt. Capistrano viewed from Barangay Cabangahan

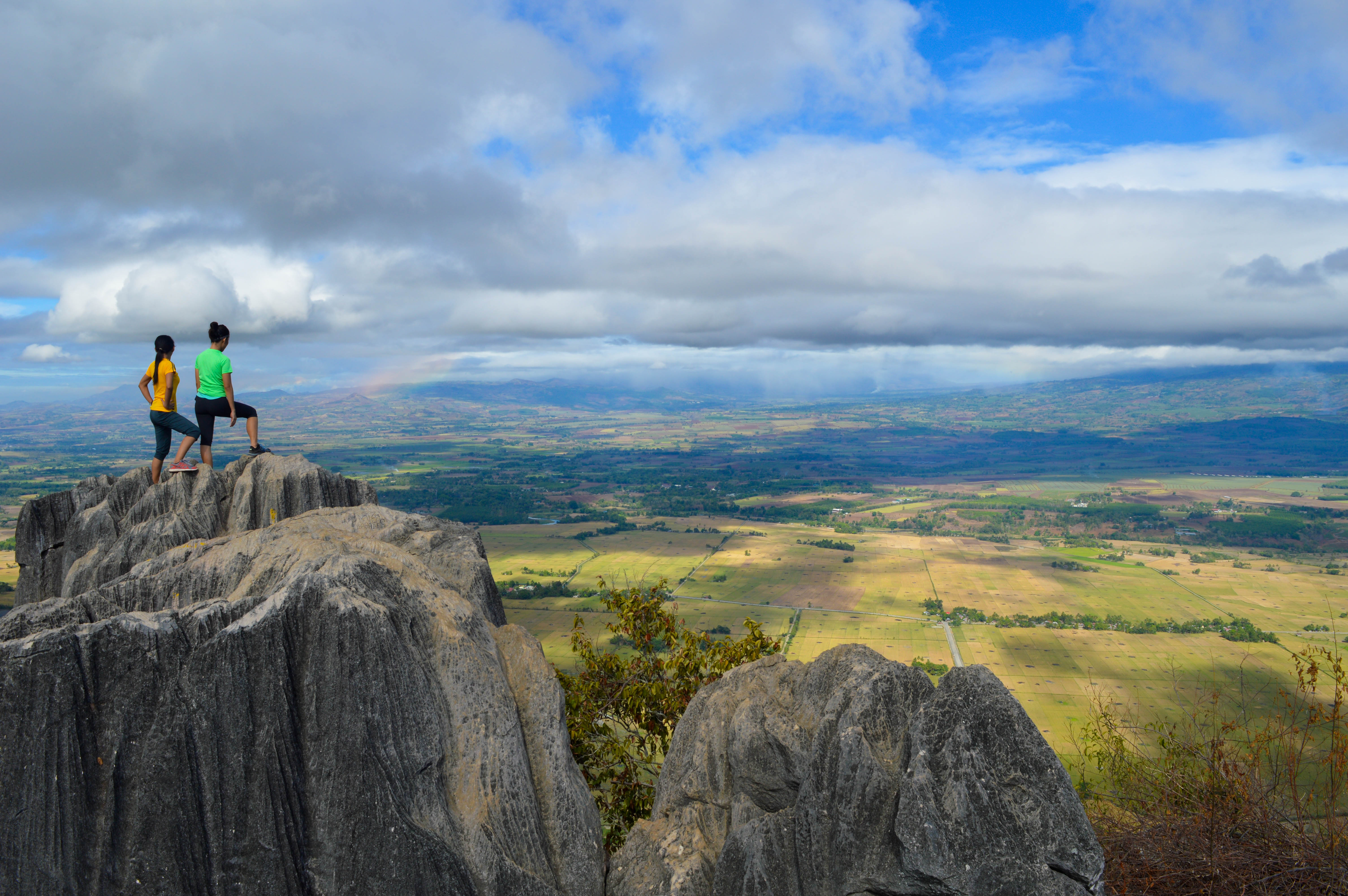
View from the summit of Mt. Capistrano

Mt. Capistrano
Famous as the evacuation area in World War II, this mountain is characterized by its rock formations and caves. Nature trekkers and mountain climbers find a good spot at the top, albeit rough and sharp, to see a vista of Bukidnon's grandeur as it offers views of the nearby mountains and the acres of rice and cornfields. Located at Barangay Managok, it is 18 km from the City of Malaybalay proper bound south.

Roxas Monument
Roxas Monument is a historical park whose principal feature is the monument of the Philippine's first president of the independent Republic, Manuel Roxas. History has it that President Roxas hid secretly in the old school, now known as Casisang Central Integrated School, after escaping from Japanese Imperial Army at the height of World War II on his way to Australia. The monument was erected in honor of Roxas’ brief stay as well as to remember the WWII prisoners of war. The Roxas Monument is located at Casisang, Malaybalay – a few minutes ride going South from the city proper.

Dalwangan Centennial Marker
This is the spot identified to be where the Northern and Southern Army of the US Air Force linked in World War II. The centennial marker is erected at Barangay Dalwangan, City of Malaybalay.

Torre ni David (David's Tower)
Is a popular edifice along the highway of Cabangahan, Malaybalay. This old three-storey house was built in 1962 by David Valmorida. An old article which was featured in Inquirer.net in 2007 reported that there are some strange and unexplained occurrences in this house.

Ereccion de Pueblo
The monument of creation of the town is proudly standing at Plaza Rizal. It depicts the 1877 agreement between the Spanish Colonizers and local leaders such as Datu Mampaalong

D' Stable Eco Resort (Quadra)
D' Stable Eco Resort is more popularly known as Quadra. It is located in Santa Cruz, Sumpong, Malaybalay, close to Shepherds Meadow Memorial Park. Quadra has a ranch-like setting, with a horses, stables, huts and cottages built on grassy grounds and a mountain view backdrop. Accommodation and horseback riding may also be available.

Two Trees
The Two Trees is a part of the Provincial Tree Park of Bukidnon, which the Northern Entrance is at the Kaamulan Grounds and its Southern Entrance is at Gawad Kalinga (also known as Capitol Village), Barangay 9. The Park is traversed by the Kalawaig River, a tributary of Sawaga River, the major river of Malaybalay City (except in the Upper Pulangi District where the Pulangi River reigns), which starts at Barangay 1.

Monastery of Carmelite Nuns
The monastery nuns provide an environment of natural attractions with its grounds as well as spiritual blessings of peace renewal.

Jesuit Retreat House
Primarily a retreat center, its well kept grounds being on the banks of a creek offer the intrepid a climbing experience amidst a mini rainforest ambiance. It is owned by the Jesuits.

MKAETDC or The Mt. Kitanglad Agriculture and Ecological Center
Is a Gawad Saka 2006 First-place winner for showcasing an ecological and agricultural all organic, all natural lifestyle. This is a site for bird watching, trekking, camping, fishing and eco-walk. Being situated at the foothill of Mr. Kitanglad, a rare flight of the Bukidnon eagle could be in your sights as you walk along misty eco- trails with a cool temperature to equal that of Trinidad valley in Mt. Province. The site hosts conferences and seminars.

Lapanday Farm
The sweetest pineapples exported fresh are from this Filipino agri-corporation. Its plantations are located in different sites and the headquarters are found not more than a 10-minute drive from the city's commercial section. This is owned by the Lorenzo family, a name long associated with the pineapples and agriculture.

Nomiarc and Stock Farm
This area is the site of farm showcases where animals of good stocks (bred) and high value vegetables are seeded and tested for research by government technicians.

Nature Park and Swimming Pool
This natural attraction features scenic environs the site of a varied flora and fauna, providing varied environmental activities of which bird watching is one. A swimming pool and another for children welcome the daring to try clean, coolest water. Located at Kimambong, Barangay Sumpong

Hernandez Ranch
Owned privately by the Hernandez family, the site was developed with horseback riding trails, swimming pools and fishing grounds.

Q Park II
Here's a new place ideal for prayer and reflection in Bukidnon, Mindanao, Philippines. Q Park II, located at Barangay Kalasungay, Malaybalay, boasts of a lawn, a view of the Bukidnon mountain ranges and Malaybalay's signature cool breeze. An alternative to the Monastery of Transfiguration, which is also located in Malaybalay. Admission to Q Park II is free and this park is open from 9 am to 5 pm, Tuesday to Sunday. Closed on Mondays.

Matin-ao Spring Resort
Matin-ao resort is located about 21 kilometers from Malaybalay proper and 8 kilometers away from Valencia City. Compared to Nasuli, Matin-ao has more shallow areas making it a safe place to swim for children.

== Sports ==
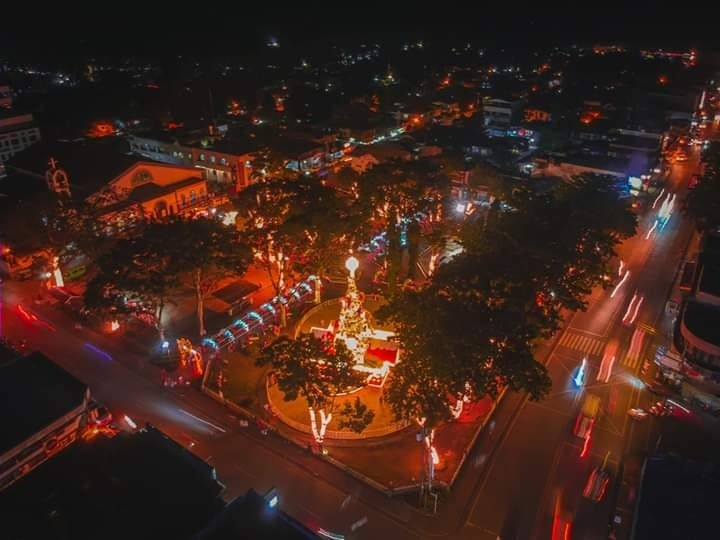
Malaybalay City Plaza

Sports venues in the city include around 60 basketball courts, 10 tennis courts, a bowling alley, and a pelota court, and 10 tennis courts. All barangays in the city have at least one basketball court. With a total of 60 basketball courts, there are some barangays with 2 or more basketball courts. The recent resurgence of badminton as a favorite sport has led to the opening of new facilities, including the former Belyca Cinema.

There are four gymnasiums and auditoriums, which are used for sports events as well as other public gatherings. The former Faro Cinema was converted into a military base camp.

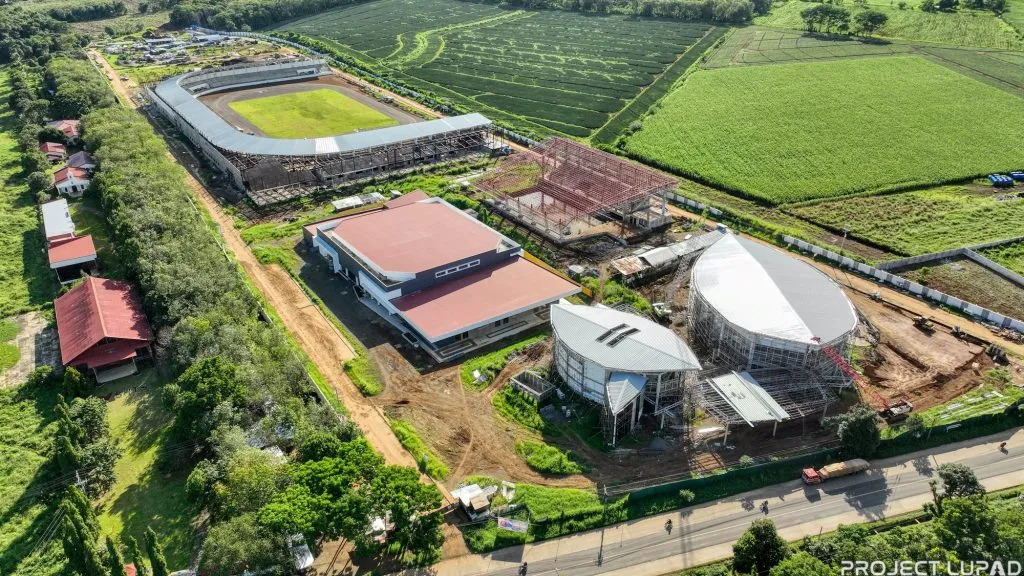
Bukidnon Sports and Cultural Complex

Malaybalay will also be the site of the province-owned Bukidnon Sports and Cultural Complex which would be built in barangay Laguitas. It will include a track oval, swimming pool and other associated facilities.

There are four spring resorts located in Bangcud and Managok, and four plazas and parks.

The Bukidnon Provincial Zoological Park was opened in 2019 at the Kaamulan Grounds.

== Government ==
Mayors of Malaybalay
Mayor	Years
Juan Melendez	1903–1908
Fernando Damasco	1909–1913
Jose Ruiz	1914–1918
Juan Melendez	1924–1936
Faustino Caterial	1936–1937
Catalino Damasco	1937–1939
Gerardo Pimentel	1940–1941
Salvador Alberto	1943–1947
Teofilo Salcedo	1948–1951
Fortunato Carbajal Sr.	1951–1955
Lorenzo S. Dinlayan	1955–1971
Timoteo C. Ocaya	1972–1979
Edilberto B. Mamawag	1979–1980*
Reginaldo N. Tilanduca	1980–1986
Violeta T. Labaria	1986*
Almaco A. Villanueva	1987*
Rogelio M. Bides	1988*
Reginaldo N. Tilanduca	1988–1992
Bob Tabios-Casanova	April 1992-June 1992
Nicolas C. Jurolan	1992–2001
Florencio T. Flores Jr.	2001–2010
Ignacio W. Zubiri	2010–2019
Florencio T. Flores Jr.	2019–February 18, 2022
Jay Warren R. Pabillaran (OIC)	February 18, 2022 - June 30, 2022
Jay Warren R. Pabillaran	2022–Present

=== City administration ===
The city is administered by the City Mayor together with the Vice Mayor and the Sangguniang Panlungsod. The mayor is the local chief executive officer of the city and exercises control and supervision over all local administrative offices as mandated by the Local government code of the Philippines (1991). The city also has a City Administrator that assists the mayor.

The Sangguniang Panlungsod (or SP) serves as the local legislative arm of the city. It enacts ordinances and issues regulations that are necessary to promote the propriety and general welfare of the city's residents; ensure the health, safety, comfort and convenience of its constituents, maintain peace and order, improve and promote high public morals, and ensure the protection of the properties within the city's jurisdiction. There are 12 elected Sangguniang members and a permanent Sangguniang Panlungsod secretary. The Sangguniang Panlungsod is headed by the Vice Mayor, acting as its presiding officer. There are twelve (12) elected Sanggunian members and one permanent Sangguniang Panlungsod secretary.

Malaybalay 46 barangays each headed by a barangay chairman together with seven Sangguniang Barangay members.

Malaybalay City Hall

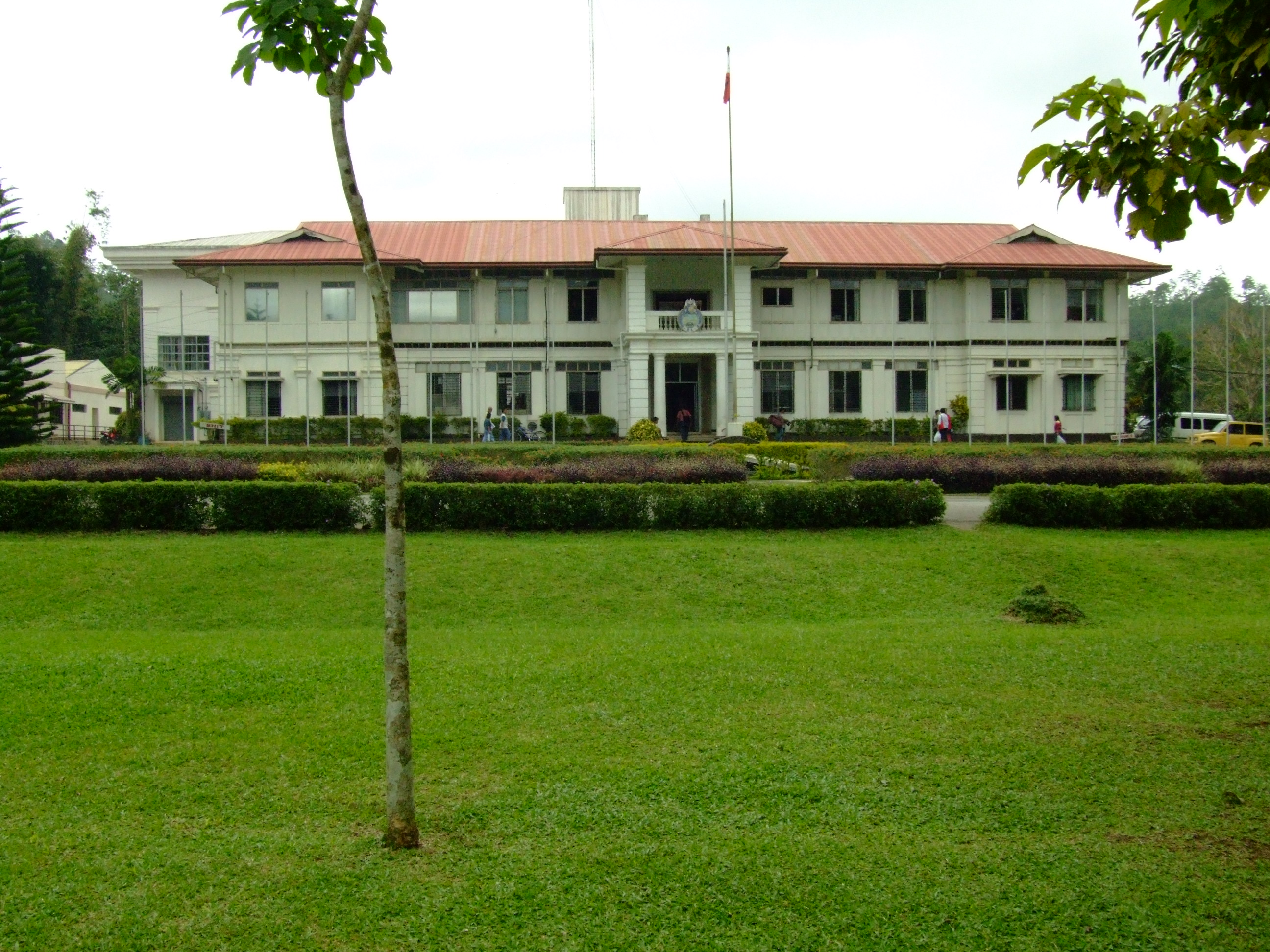
The Provincial Capitol of the province of Bukidnon is in Malaybalay.

== Infrastructure ==
=== Transportation ===
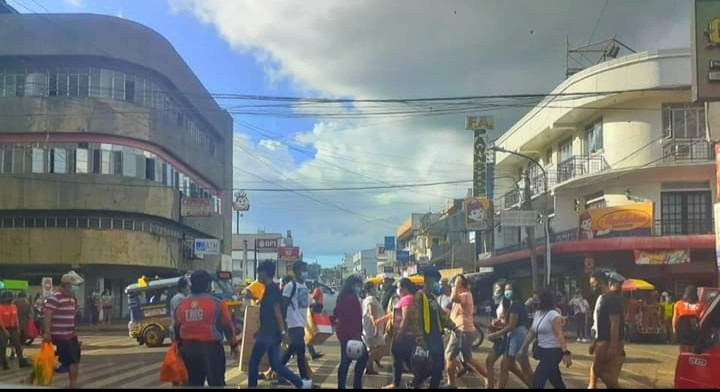
View of Sayre Highway and the downtown Malaybalay

Roads and highways

There are about 820.89 kilometers of road linking the different parts of the city. 102.70 km or 12.51% are classified as National Road, 60.40 km or 7.36% Provincial Road, 61.35 km or 7.47% City Road, and 596.44 km or 72.66% barangay roads. About 14.14% of all roads in the city are paved, that is, either concrete or asphalt. These are in the poblacion areas. At least 85.86% are unpaved (gravel or earth filled). These are primarily the barangay roads. These unpaved roads leading to the rural barangays usually require regular maintenance since they are easily destroyed by heavy rains. There are also logging roads leading to the forestal communities, but these are usually passable by farm animals and single motor cycles only, making it hard for communities to transport products into the market.

Connecting the various road networks and cutting across rivers and creeks are at least 22 bridges of various types. Almost all of these bridges are said to be in good condition. There are 15 bridges or 69.35% totaling to about 470.67 m in length that are administered nationally, while 3 bridges of about 115.00 m are under the province's administration. Only about 93.00 m or about 13.70% are under the administration of city and barangays.

The Sayre Highway bisects the Poblacion, the main urban center of the city, serving as the main thoroughfare of the city. Buses that ply the Cagayan de Oro, General Santos, Butuan (not operational) and Davao City route, as well as jeepneys, multi-cabs, vans and private vehicles pass through this highway. Suburbs are served by multicabs, motorelas and improvised bicycles (trisikads).

The current main highway in the city center is now congested. Heavy traffic and congestion has been observed in the main highway, especially during peak hours. The absence of proper and adequate parking areas further contributes to the congestion. The situation underlies the need for a bypass road as well as more traffic aides. The city has two proposed roads to answer the above concerns. The first proposal is the Circumferential Road from Sumpong to DPWH Depot in Casisang, which is 2.5 km. in length. The other is the by-pass road from Dalwangan to San Jose with a total stretch of 15 km. The Butuan-Malaybalay Road becomes the secondary road connecting Esperanza, Agusan del Sur, which is scheduled to complete in the future but this could be a private transport.

Public transportation

There are various types of public transportation. Buses that ply the Bukidnon, Cagayan de Oro, and Davao City route are used for travel from the city to other provinces. There are also mini-vans that transport passengers from Cagayan de Oro to Malaybalay. The multi-cabs ply the main highway from the poblacion proper to other points of destination within the city and nearby barangays. The four-wheeled motorelas are limited to the inner streets. Recently, tri-sikads have also begun to operate in the inner streets of Barangay Sumpong. Jeepneys are usually used for travel from the poblacion to other barangays and municipalities. In far-flung areas, motorcycles (habal-habal) are the fastest means of transportation.

The main terminal for public transportation vehicles is in the public market, especially for buses, mini-vans, and jeepneys. For motorelas and tri-sikads, street-corners of convergence serve as terminals or waiting areas.

With the increase in traffic of both vehicles and pedestrians, especially in the poblacion, there is a growing concern for better and safer organized streets. There is a need to designate walking pavements or pedestrian lanes, including pedestrian overpass especially for the use of children and students crossing the major highway.

Airports and seaports

Malaybalay once had an airport located at Barangay Casisang but closed in the 1990s by the provincial government to give land for housing; the nearest one is the Laguindingan Airport in Cagayan de Oro. The city also relies on the Cagayan de Oro seaport for the delivery of its products to other destinations in the Philippines as it is the closest port to the city.

Housing Development

To close the housing gap of 6.5 million between 2017 and 2020, the government needs to build 250,000 houses a year. Currently, however, the housing sector can only build 203,000 to 205,000 units annually between 2016 and 2019.

Housing developments in Malaybalay includes Salang Homes Subdivision, Lumina Homes, Greenfields Subdivision, Dumalahay Subdivision, and Legacie Country Homes.

=== Utilities ===
Electricity

All the 46 barangays are already energized. Majority or 57.07% of the city's households have electricity for lighting. 39.88% of households still use kerosene.

Malaybalay is served by the Bukidnon Second Electric Cooperative Incorporated or BUSECO, which started its operations in 1979 (Table 77: Number of Connections by Type of Users and Average Consumption). Recent data from BUSECO indicate a total of 16,157 power connections. Of these 14,107 or 87.31% are residential connections, while 1,454 or 9.00% are commercial establishments.

While the number of household connections is 9 times more than the combined industrial and commercial connections, the average monthly consumption of households is 3.06% less than the latter. In actual number, businesses use at least 73,560.39 kWh per month more than households. This trend is not surprising because businesses tend to use more electricity than households.

However, the data underlines the need to plan ahead to ensure that there is enough power supply for the city's growing power demands. Already, at least 43% of the population remains without electricity and those who do have experience regular power outage. This sector needs attention especially with the expected increase in population as well as business establishments.

Water

The water system and services of Malaybalay is provided by Malaybalay City Water District (MCWD) in which its office is located in Barangay Sumpong.

Telecommunications, Media and Courier Services

There are 2 major telephone companies in the city, the Southern Telecommunications Company (SOTELCO) and Philcom. Both Philcom and Sotelco offer Internet connections. Mobile phone services available in the city include Globe, Smart, TM and Sun. With the growing demand for better communication systems companies are facing the challenge of providing better and higher quality services to the population.

Broadcast media include 5 radio and 2 television repeater stations, including a cable station. Most national dailies such as the Philippine Daily Inquirer and Philippine Star are available. Local newspapers include the Bukidnon Newswatch, Gold Star Daily and Bukidnon Plateau.

There are 4 major courier services available in the city for national and international forwarding. The post office, the Bureau of Telecommunication and 2 telegraphic companies serve other communication needs.

The telecommunication technologies have continued to improve over the years. But the mode of communication in the upland barangays are still the old and tested letter sending through vehicle drivers and broadcasting over the public radio stations.

The city's mobile and internet services are provided by Globe Telecom, PLDT, Parasat Cable TV and Smart Communications.

=== Law enforcement ===
The Malaybalay Police Station is responsible for the protection of the city's population against crime. Data for year 2005 indicate that the police force is 76 and serving a population of 136,210. This translates to a ratio of 1 policeman for every 1,792 persons in the city. Ideal ratio for police to population is 1:500 and the minimum standard police-population ratio is 1:1,000. In terms of area coverage, this translates to 1 policeman for every 1,424 hectares.

There are 9 police community precincts located in Sumpong, Dalwangan, Casisang, Aglayan, Managok, Bangcud, Zamboangita, Can-ayan and Barangay 9 (Public Market). The police force to population ratio is highest in Casisang with 1 policeman for every 13,874 individuals. Lowest ratio is in Sumpong with 1:151. A low ratio indicates that there are more policemen available to serve the population of a given area.

Further analysis indicates that based on the total population, the number of existing police force and the minimum police-population ratio of 1:1,000, the city still needs 606 policemen.

Malaybalay City host 2 military and police camps. One is the Camp Ramon M. Onahon, located at Barangay 7. It is the provincial headquarters of the Philippine National Police. The other one is Camp Osito Bahian, located at Impalambong, Barangay 10. It is the home of the 403rd Infantry Brigade

Barangay Public Safety Officer (BPSO) also assists in the peace-keeping efforts at the barangay level.

=== Medical facilities ===
- Bukidnon Provincial Medical Center
- Bethel Baptist Hospital, Inc.
- Malaybalay Polymedic General Hospital
- Malaybalay Medical Hospital
- St. Jude Thaddeus General Hospital

== Education ==
Bukidnon State University

=== Colleges and universities ===
Malaybalay City has four tertiary schools, found in the Poblacion area:

- Bukidnon State University (BukSU)
- San Isidro College (SIC)
- Mindanao Arts and Technological Institute (MATI)
- STI College Malaybalay

=== Primary and secondary schools ===
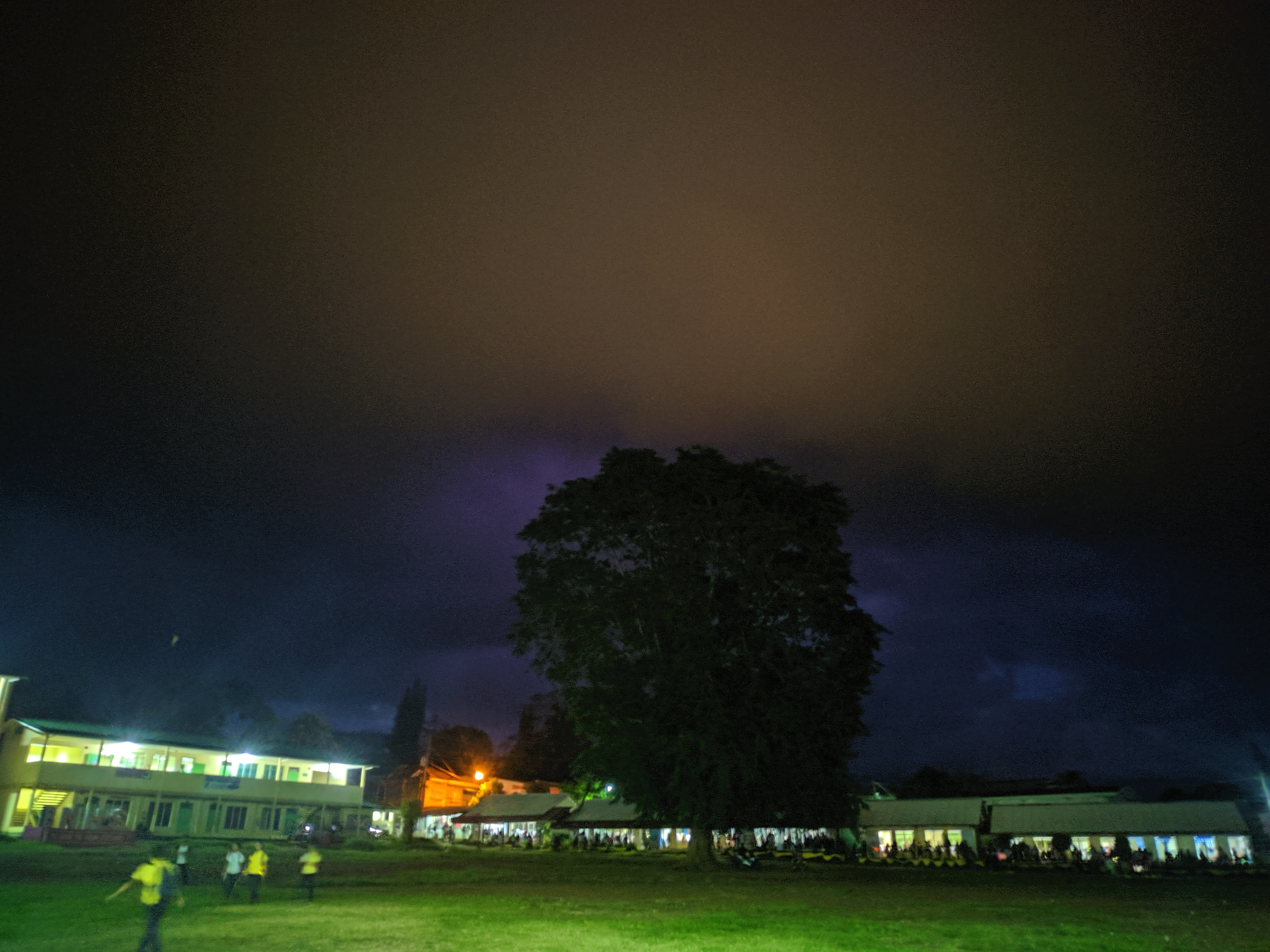
Bukidnon National High School grounds

The city has 64 primary/elementary schools and 13 secondary schools, under the Division of Malaybalay City. Almost every barangay has at least one primary/elementary school, while secondary schools are strategically located in areas with higher population. Majority of the primary and secondary schools are run by the government through the Department of Education. The accompanying table lists the elementary and secondary schools in the Division of Malaybalay City.

Public Schools

District	School name	School ID	Location
I	Capitán Angel Elementary School	126583	Capitán Angel
I	Dalwangan Elementary School	126580	Dalwangan
I	Kalasungay Central School	126582	Kalasungay
I	Kalasungay National High School	314915	Kalasungay
I	New Ilocos Elementary School	126589	Dalwangan
I	Patpat Elementary School	126590	Patpat
II	Baganao Elementary School	126575	Kibalabag
II	Can-ayan Integrated School	314917	Can-ayan
II	Candiisan Elementary School	126578	Can-ayan
II	KIbalabag Elementary School	126584	Kibalabag
II	Kilap-agan Elementary School	126585	Can-ayan
II	Manalog Elementary School	126587	Manalog
II	Sumpong Central School	126593	Sumpong
II	Tag-ilanao Elementary School	126594	Can-ayan
II	Tintinaan Elementary School	126595	Can-ayan
III	Bukidnon National High School	303950	Barangay 03
III	Bukidnon National High School – Dalwangan Annex	325504	Dalwangan
III	Bukidnon National High School – Imbayao Annex	325503	Imbayao
III	Imbayao Elementary School	126581	Imbayao
III	Santa Ana Elementary School	125592	Casisang
IV	Barangay 09 Elementary School	199510	Barangay 09
IV	BCT Elementary School	126576	Barangay 10
IV	Casisang National High School	314914	Casisang
IV	Malaybalay City Central School	126586	Barangay 04
V	Airport Village Elementary School	126574	Casisang
V	Casisang Central Integrated School	126579	Casisang
V	Mabuhay Integrated School	126565	San Jose
V	Malaybalay City National Science High School	314904	Aglayan
V	Natid-asan Elementary School	126588	Casisang
V	Panamucan Elementary School	126551	San Jose
V	Malaybalay City National High School	314916	San Jose
V	San Jose Elementary School	126591	San Jose
VI	Aglayan Central School	126557	Aglayan
VI	Balangbang Elementary School	126535	Laguitas
VI	Bendolan Elementary School	126559	Magsaysay
VI	Cabangahan Elementary School	126561	Cabangahan
VI	Laguitas Elementary School	126564	Laguitas
VI	Magsaysay Elementary School	126567	Magsaysay
VI	Malaybalay City National High School	314916	San Jose
VI	Mapayag Elementary School	126569	Mapayag
VII	Bangcud Central School	126558	Bangcud
VII	Bangcud National High School	303946	Bangcud
VII	Binalbagan Elementary School	126560	Simayà
VII	Calawag Elementary School	126562	Ápò Macote
VII	Dapulan Elementary School	126563	Ápò Macote
VII	Macote Elementary School	126566	Ápò Macote
VII	Padernal Elementary School	126570	Santo Niño
VII	Simayà Elementary School	126573	Simayà
VIII	Apò Macote National High School	325505	Ápò Macote
VIII	Lalawan Elementary School	126542	Linabò
VIII	Linabò Central School	126544	Linabò
VIII	Malapgap Elementary School	126568	Sinanglanan
VIII	Paiwaig Elementary School	199511	Linabò
VIII	San Martin Elementary School	126571	San Martin
VIII	San Martin Agro-Industrial National High School	303982	San Martin
VIII	San Roque Elementary School	126572	Sinanglanan
VIII	Sawaga Elementary School	126552	Violeta
IX	Bagong Silang Elementary School	126534	Maligaya
IX	Dumayas Elementary School	126539	Maligaya
IX	Langasihan Elementary School	126543	Managók
IX	Lunokan Elementary School	126545	Miglamin
IX	Maligaya Elementary School	126546	Maligaya
IX	Managók Central School	126547	Managók
IX	Managók National High School	303973	Managók
IX	Managók National High School – Lalawan Annex	325501	Linabò
IX	Managók National High School – Miglamin Annex	314920	Miglamin
IX	Matangpatang Elementary School	126549	Miglamin
IX	Miglamin Elementary School	126550	Miglamin
X	Busdì Integrated School	325502	Busdì
X	Caburacanan Elementary School	126537	Caburacanan
X	Indalasà Elementary School	126540	Indalasà
X	Kibalabag (Silae) Elementary School	199518	Silae
X	Kulaman Elementary School	126541	Kulaman
X	Mapulo Elementary School	126548	Mapulo
X	Saint Peter Elementary School	126554	Saint Peter
X	Silae Elementary School	126553	Silae
X	Silae National High School	303984	Silae
X	Silae National High School – Saint Peter Annex	314905	Saint Peter
X	Tuburan Elementary School	259006	Mapulo
X	Zamboanguita Central School	126556	Zamboanguita

Private Schools
  - Bethel Baptist Christian Academy
  - Casisang International Christian School
  - Marywoods Academy
  - St. John's School of Malaybalay City
  - Xific University Prep

== Media ==
Parasat Cable TV and Prime Cable Network provides cable television in the city. ABS-CBN and GMA are also available. Broadcast towers are located at the peak of Mount Kitanglad, the fourth highest mountain in the Philippines and satellite dish cable TV such as Cignal TV and SatLite (replaced by Dream Satellite TV).

=== AM Stations ===
- DXDB Radyo Totoo 594 Malaybalay (Catholic Media Network)
- DXMB RMN Malaybalay 648 (Radio Mindanao Network)
- DXCB Bombo Radyo Malaybalay 864 (Bombo Radyo Philippines/People's Broadcasting Service, Inc.)

=== FM Stations ===
- 88.1 Radyo Bandera Malaybalay (Bandera News Philippines/Palawan Broadcasting Corporation)
- 90.5 Juander Radyo Malaybalay (SIAM Broadcasting Network/RSV Broadcasting Network, Inc.)
- DXGH-FM 99.3 Magik FM (Century Broadcasting Network)
- 101.7 XFM Bukidnon (Rizal Memorial Colleges Broadcasting Corporation)
- DXBU 104.5 (Bukidnon State University)
- FM Radio Bukidnbon 105.1 (Philippine Collective Media Corporation)
- 106.3 Love Radio Malaybalay (Manila Broadcasting Company is the major radio station in the city.
- 107.1 Happy FM (Iddes Broadcast Group)
- Priase Radio 107.9 (MIT Radio-TV Network)

Nations newspapers are available in the city like the Philippine Daily Inquirer, Philippine Star and Manila Bulletin. The Central Mindanao Newswatch is the major local newspaper distributor.

== Sister Cities ==
Domestic

- Valencia, Bukidnon
- Cagayan de Oro
- Ozamiz
- Tandag
- Marawi
- Tagum
- Baguio
- Iligan

International

- Ürümqi, China
- Lhasa, China

== Notable personalities ==
- Elenito Galido – Bishop of the Diocese of Iligan
- Archie Gamboa – 23rd Chief of the Philippine National Police, 2019–2020
- Teofisto Guingona III – Philippine Senator, 2010–2016
- Gerald Tabios – Elite endurance athlete
- Migz Zubiri – Philippine Senator, 2007–2011; 2016–present

== See also ==
- Kaamulan Festival
