= Linabo =

Settlement in the Philippines

- Barangay
- Map of Mindanao showing the location of Linabo Linabo (Philippines)
- Coordinates: 8°03′15″N 125°09′18″E
- Country: Philippines
- Province: Bukidnon
- City: Malaybalay
- District: Basakan

Government
  - Type: Barangay Council
  - Body: Sangguniang Barangay
  - Chairman: Edgar Hernando
- Elevation: 359 m (1,178 ft)

Population (2015 census)
  - Total: 6,933
- PSGC: 101312026
- IRA: ₱ 6.521 million (2020)

Linabo is an urban barangay in the Basakan District of Malaybalay, Philippines. According to the 2015 census, it has a population of 6,933 people.

== Geography ==
Linabo is bounded to the north by Laguitas and San Jose, to the east by Maligaya and Miglamin, to the south by Violeta and Managok, and to the west by Aglayan. Its terrain is characterized by plains in the west formed by the Sawaga River. Rolling hills are found in Sitio Lalawan while Sitio Paiwaig and the eastern boundary is characterized as mountainous. It is largely an agricultural village where rice is the principal crop with some cassava, banana, sugarcane, and rubber grown as secondary crops. Most of Linabo is within the Bukidnon Higaonon Tribal Association (BUHITA) ancestral domain claim, which spans over 34,452 hectares and covers twelve barangays of Malaybalay and two barangays of Cabanglasan.

== History ==
Linabo is one of the oldest settlements in Bukidnon, having been recorded in 19th century documents by the Spanish clergy. Under the Spanish Empire, it was part of the town of Sevilla, Province of Misamis, whose administration gradually shifted to Linabo because of its larger population. In 1907, the Municipality of Malaybalay was created, transferring the town center from Linabo to Oroquieta (the other name for Malaybalay).
