= Maligaya, Malaybalay =

Barangay in Bukidnon, Philippines

Coordinates: 8°02′30″N 125°12′22″E

Maligaya is a rural barangay in the Basakan District of Malaybalay, Philippines. According to the 2015 census, it has a population of 2,113 people. It is bordered to the north and east by Miglamin, to the south by Managok, and to the west by Linabo. The village was a sitio of Managok named Abuhan until it was separated to become a regular barangay named Maligaya.
