= Laguitas =

Settlement in the Philippines

- Barangay
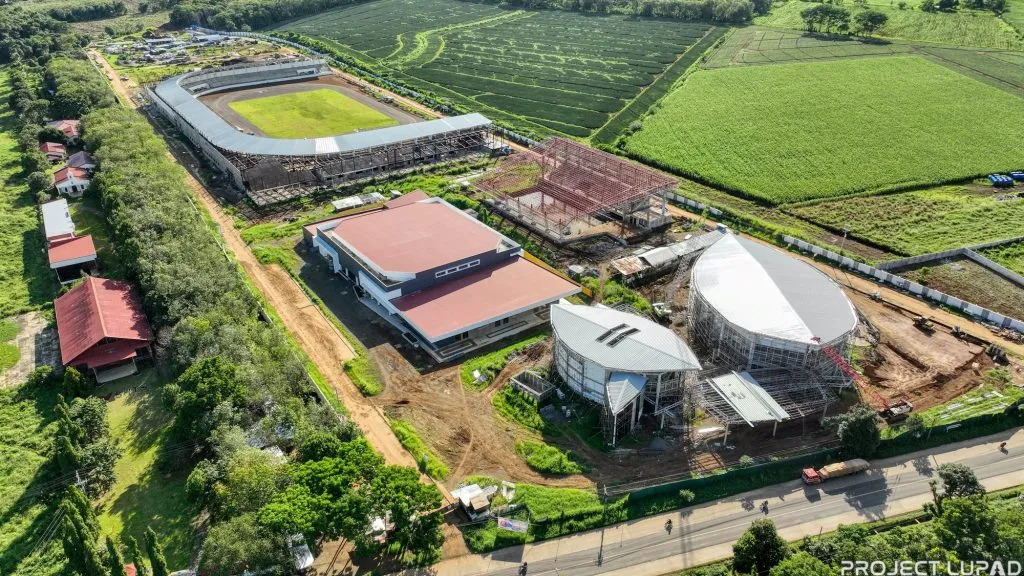
- Bukidnon Sports and Cultural Complex

- Seal
- Interactive map of Laguitas
- Coordinates: 8°5′11.5″N 125°7′49.6″E
- Country: Philippines
- Province: Bukidnon
- City: Malaybalay
- District: South Highway District

Government
  - Type: Barangay Council
  - Body: Sangguniang Barangay
  - Chairman: Rosanna M. Linhay

Area
  - Total: 22.65 km^{2} (8.75 sq mi)
- Elevation: 528 m (1,732 ft)

Population (2015)
  - Total: 3,233
  - Density: 142.7/km^{2} (369.7/sq mi)
- PSGC: 101312023.
- IRA (2020): Php 3,727,494

Laguitas is a rural barangay in the South Highway District of Malaybalay, Bukidnon, in the Philippines. It is bounded to the north and east by San Jose, to the south by Linabo and Aglayan, and to the west by Magsaysay. According to the 2015 census, it has a population of 3,233 people.

== Profile ==
Laguitas is located on a fertile valley along the Sawaga River. Most of the land is dedicated to agriculture and areas along the national highway are dedicated for residential and commercial purposes. Thus, economy is mainly driven by agriculture, where pineapple is the major crop. Other crops produced in significant volume include banana, sugarcane, and corn. There is little commercial activity and there are few industries. A future sports complex facility is to be built in Laguitas by the national and provincial government. Laguitas is subdivided into seven purok and has three sitios: Kiocab to the south, Manlungay on the west bank of the Sawaga, and Balangbang to the east side of the Sawaga. There are two public elementary schools in Laguitas administered by the Department of Education through the Division of Malaybalay City. These are Laguitas Elementary School in the village proper; the other is Balangbang Elementary School in Balangbang

== History ==
A popular historical narrative about the establishment of Laguitas is centered around a legendary maiden named "Quitas," who was usually seen during a full moon sitting at a big flat sardonyx stone beside a balete tree along the Sawaga. Quitas was described as a beautiful youth with long, black hair running to her waist and enveloped with fragrance. She was also described as interacting with wildlife as if she were talking to them, leading to the villagers to believe that she was a fairy or a diwata. When Spanish colonizers heard of the story, the place around her purported sanctuary including the nearby settlement was called Laguitas. Nonetheless, Laguitas was an old settlement and had an organized administration as a barrio of Malaybalay. In 1972, Sitio Sinakuruwan to the north was separated from Laguitas to become a regular barangay under the name San Jose. Sharing the vicissitudes of its mother town and the Philippines as a whole, Laguitas grew into this present, developing community in the southern part of the city.
