= Casisang =

Settlement in the Philippines

Casisang Kasisang
- Barangay
- Barangay Casisang; Báriyu Kasisang
- Malaybalay City Hall in Casisang

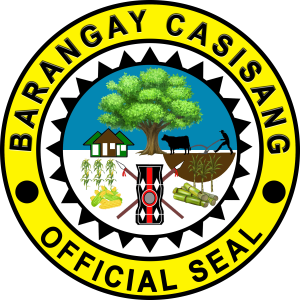
- Seal
- Interactive map of Casisang
- Coordinates: 8.13499°N 125.127491°E
- Country: Philippines
- Province: Bukidnon
- City: Malaybalay
- District: South Highway District
- Barangayhood: February 7, 1961

Government
  - Type: Barangay Council
  - Chairman: Bonifacio G. Valiente

Area
  - Total: 32.84 km^{2} (12.68 sq mi)
- Elevation: 600 m (2,000 ft)

Population (2020)
  - Total: 29,406
  - Density: 895.4/km^{2} (2,319/sq mi)
- Time zone: PST (UTC+8)
- PSGC: 101312012
- IRA (2020): Php 20,690,114

Casisang (Binukid: Báriyu Kasisang) is the most populous of the 46 barangays of Malaybalay. It is the seat of government of the City of Malaybalay since the City Hall is located here. Situated in the South Highway District of Malaybalay, Casisang borders on the north with the Poblacion barangays of Barangay 11, Barangay 7, and Barangay 9, on the east with Can-ayan, on the south with San Jose, Magsaysay, and Mapayag, and on the west by Imbayao and Kalasungay. According to 2015 census Casisang has a population of 25,696 people.

== History ==
Under Spanish rule, Barangay Casisang was part of the Barangay Población of Malaybalay. Leaders of Malaybalay extend services to Casisang like in the person of Mr. Esteban Tilanducâ who was delegated as capitán of Malaybalay. He was the mediator between the people and the government. People turn to him for their financial and economic problems. He owned a vast land in the barangay and hired people to work in his farm. Tilanducâ was considered as one of the original settlers of Barangay Casisang. Despite the organization of the community, the natives nonetheless preferred to stay in the forest in fear or dissatisfaction toward Spanish administration. Only when the Americans came, the people eventually learned to settle in the plains. They began to organize communities under a Datù designated as tribal leader. Schools were established which contributed to the economic growth of the community and the life of the people.

Barangay Casisang was separated from Poblacion, Malaybalay and became a regular barangay in February 7, 1961, under Resolution # 14-Series of 1961.

== Geography ==
Casisang is situated in a gently sloping area and in the west it is gradually rising as it touches the foothills of Mt. Kitanglad Range. On the east, the Sawaga River cuts Casisang from its component Sitio Natid-asan where hills make a boundary with Barangay Can-ayan. The Mamalá Creek separates Casisang from Impalambong, Kalasungay, and Imbayao. The Kalawaig Creek, on the other hand, separates Casisang and Barangay 9.

Casisang is roughly divided into "sitios":

- Casisang Proper - the barangay's center and the seat of government
- Landing - refers to the area formerly part of the Malaybalay Airport but has since been converted into a housing project; this is the most populated area of Casisang
- Sitio Natid-asan - located east of Casisang, borders Barangay Can-ayan
- Sitio Gabunan - situated in the west, it borders Mapayag and Imbayao; the Malaybalay City Memorial Park is situated here
- Sitio Santa Ana - situated in the south, it borders San Jose and Magsaysay; there are banana plantations in this site
- Sitio Kibarok - situated on the east bordering barangay Can-ayan and San Jose
- Sitio Santa Cruz - on the northwest bordering barangay Kalasungay and Imbayao

=== Climate ===
The city has a Tropical monsoon climate on the Köppen climate classification system.

== Demography ==
Casisang is a population centre of Malaybalay since there are many housing projects erected there. The Malaybalay Airport was closed and was converted into a low-cost housing project by the provincial government of Bukidnon. The housing project increased the population of Casisang into 25,696, making it the most populous barangay in Malaybalay and second in Bukidnon (after Poblacion, Valencia City).

== Education ==
Casisang is part of the Division of Malaybalay City by the Department of Education. It has several public elementary schools located in populated areas and sitios. It has two secondary schools that offer junior and senior high school courses. The list below only includes public schools.

=== Elementary ===
School	School District
Airport Village Elementary School	V
Casisang Central School	V
Natid-asan Elementary School	V
Santa Ana Elementary School	III

=== Secondary ===
School	School District
Casisang National High School	IV
Casisang Stand-alone Senior High School	V
