= Sawaga River =

River in Bukidnon, Philippines

- Sawaga River mouth Sawaga River (Philippines)
- Native name: Wahig Sawaga (Binukid)

Location
- Country: Philippines
- Region: Northern Mindanao
- Province: Bukidnon
- City: Malaybalay, Valencia
- Barangay: List: Dalwangan; Capitan Angel; Patpat; Imbayao; Kalasungay; Sumpong; Poblacion; Casisang; San Jose; Laguitas; Aglayan; Linabo; Violeta; Simaya; Cabangahan; Bangcud; Santo Niño; Nabag-o; Colonia; Mailag; Kahaponan

Physical characteristics
- Source: Mt. Tuminungan
  - location: Dalwangan, Malaybalay City
  - coordinates: 8°06′57.9″N 124°55′24.5″E
  - elevation: 2,602 m (8,537 ft)
- Mouth: Pulangi River
  - location: Kahaponan, Valencia City, Bukidnon
  - coordinates: 7°57′15″N 125°08′00″E
  - elevation: 308 m (1,010 ft)
- Length: 64.5 km (40.1 mi)
- Basin size: 42,692 ha (426.92 km^{2})

Basin features
- River system: Rio Grande de Mindanao
- Tributaries
  - left: Mamala, Casisang, Aglayan, Manupali, Bugcaon
  - right: Kabakahan, Kalasungay, Kalawaig, Malas, Paiwaig, Balongkot, Abuhan

The Sawaga River (Binukid: Wahig Sawaga) is a river in Central Bukidnon, Philippines on the island of Mindanao. A majority of its catchment area is located in Malaybalay City. Its source is from a watershed west of Mt. Tuminungan (part of the Kitanglad Range) in Barangay Dalwangan. It flows shortly northward and then eastward into Patpat and Kalasungay, the river then flows southward into the Poblacion District, past Casisang, San Jose, and Laguitas. The Lower Sawaga Valley is located in its lower course from Barangay Linabo through Bangcud until it meets with the Manupali River and ends at Pulangi River in Kahaponan, Valencia City. The Sawaga River has a total length of about 64.5 km and the basin has a total of 42,692 hectares.

The river is not navigable but it provides a significant contribution to the economy of Malaybalay as a source for irrigation. It was previously tapped as a source for water but the city government has since tapped the Kibalabag River as a new source of water. Recent physico-chemical analyses on the river showed contamination mainly from agricultural and residential runoffs.
