= Magsaysay, Malaybalay =

Barangay in Bukidnon, Philippines

Coordinates: 8°05′47″N 125°05′53″E

Magsaysay is a rural barangay in the South Highway District of Malaybalay, Philippines. According to the 2015 census, it has a population of 3,001 people. It is bounded to the north by Casisang, to the east by San Jose and Laguitas, to the south by Aglayan, and to the west by Mapayag. It was known as Sitio Dologon of Casisang, then a part of Poblacion. In 1958 it was converted into a regular barangay.
