= Imbayao =

- Barangay
- Map of Mindanao showing the location of Imbayao. Imbayao (Philippines)
- Coordinates: 8°6′58.6″N 125°1′53.6″E
- Country: Philippines
- Province: Bukidnon
- City: Malaybalay
- District: North Highway District
- Barangayhood: November 1955

Government
  - Type: Barangay Council
  - Body: Sangguniang Barangay
  - Chairman: Jean T. Maputi

Area
  - Total: 60.42 km^{2} (23.33 sq mi)
- (Note: Area claimed by Barangay Imbayao, which overlaps with the areas also claimed by Capitan Angel and the Municipality of Lantapan.)
- Elevation: 1,200 m (3,900 ft)

Population (2015)
  - Total: 1,833
  - Density: 30.34/km^{2} (78.57/sq mi)
- PSGC: 101312017
- IRA (2020): Php 2,670,304

Imbayao is a rural barangay in Malaybalay, Philippines. It is located in the North Highway District and is almost entirely within the Kitanglad Mountain Range.

== Profile ==
According to the 2015 census, Imbayao has a population of 1,833 people. It is bordered to the north by Capitan Angel, to the northeast by Kalasungay, to the east by Casisang, to the south by Mapayag and Kaatuan of Lantapan, Bukidnon, and to the west by the Mount Kitanglad Range. Most of its territory is within the Mount Kitanglad Range Natural Park and therefore hosts many zones for biodiversity conservation and sustainable agriculture. Because of this, tourism has become a growing sector in the village. The Maputi Bird Reserve and the Mount Kitanglad Agro-eco Farm, both located in Sitio Sinaburan, are a popular tourist spot in Bukidnon. Agriculture remains the primary economic activity, with livestock, vegetables, and corn being the chief products. Citronella is also grown in significant quantities, and an extraction facility has been established to develop the industry. It has two public schools which offer elementary and secondary education.

Imbayao is a hispanicization the Binukid word "imbayaw" which roughly translates "to raise". The settlement was once known as Baklayon and was a sitio of Malaybalay. In November 1955, it was inaugurated as a barrio, and the name was changed to Imbayao, to allude to its elevated location in the town.
