= Barangays of Malaybalay =

Administrative subdivisions of Malaybalay

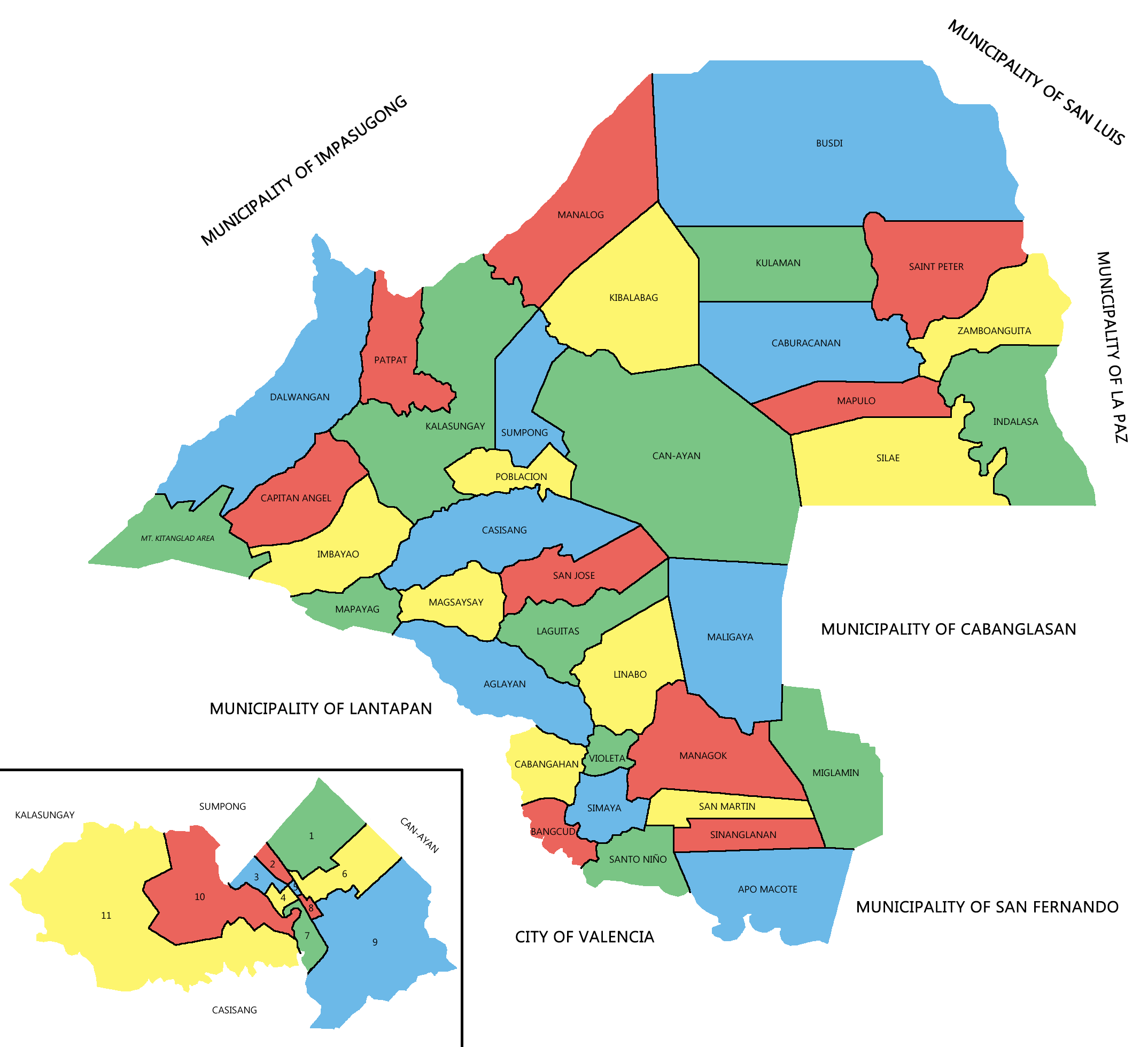
Political map of Malaybalay showing its barangays

Malaybalay, the capital of Bukidnon, is subdivided into 46 barangays. The Philippine Standard Geographic Code classifies 23 barangays as urban and 23 rural; however, the city government of Malaybalay classifies 18 barangays as urban and 28 rural. These barangays are grouped into five administrative districts, namely Basakan, North Highway, Poblacion, South Highway, and Upper Pulangi.

== Barangays by district ==
=== Basakan District ===
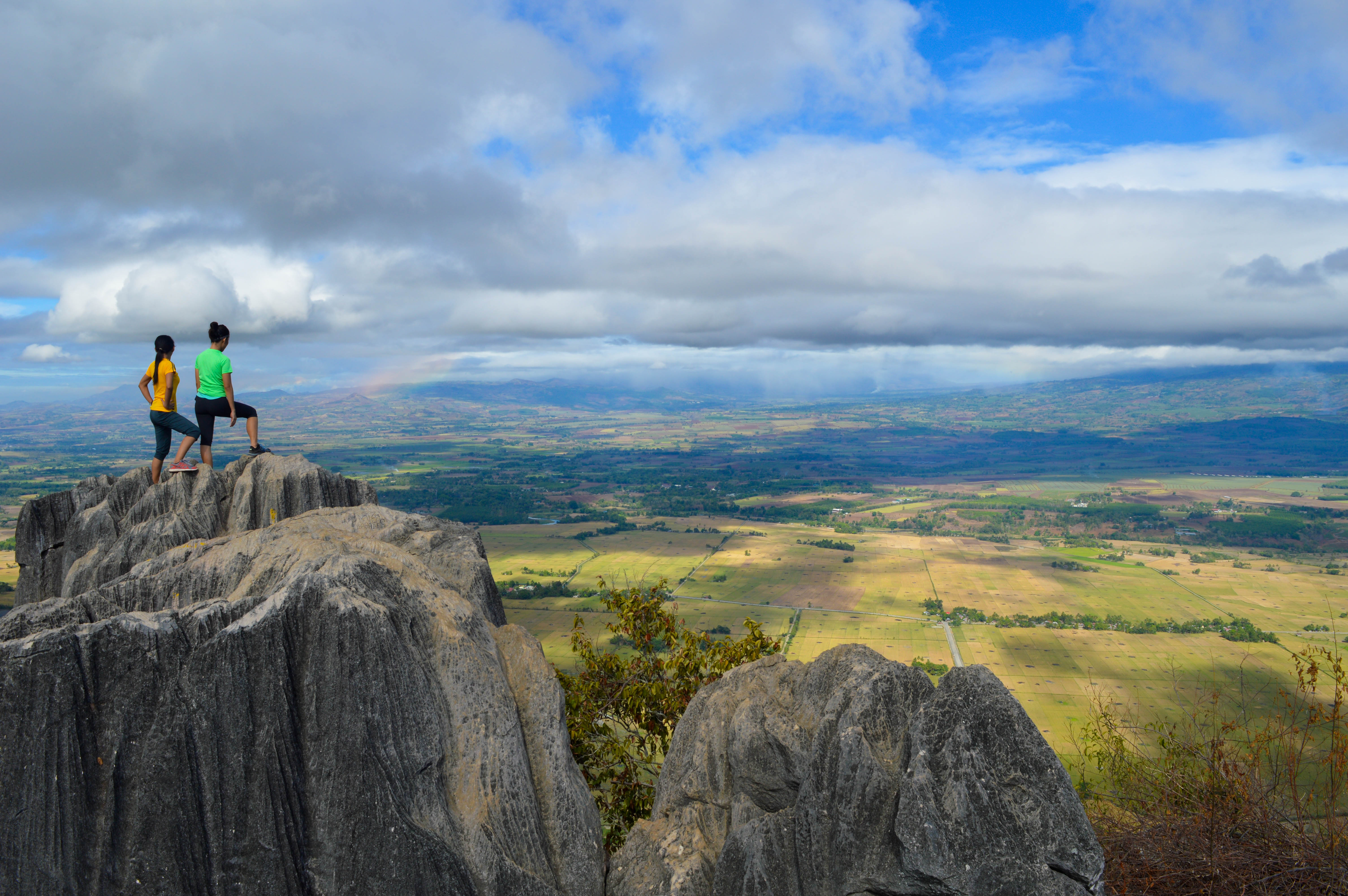
Mount Capistrano is located in the Basakan District shared by Managok, Simaya, and San Martin

Basakan District is composed of ten barangays.

Barangay	Classification	Population (2015)
Apo Macote	Rural	4,903
Linabo	Urban	6,933
Maligaya	Rural	2,113
Managok	Rural	7,200
Miglamin	Rural	3,188
San Martin	Rural	3,088
Santo Niño	Rural	1,675
Simaya	Rural	4,161
Sinanglanan	Rural	3,262
Violeta	Rural	2,199
Total		38,722

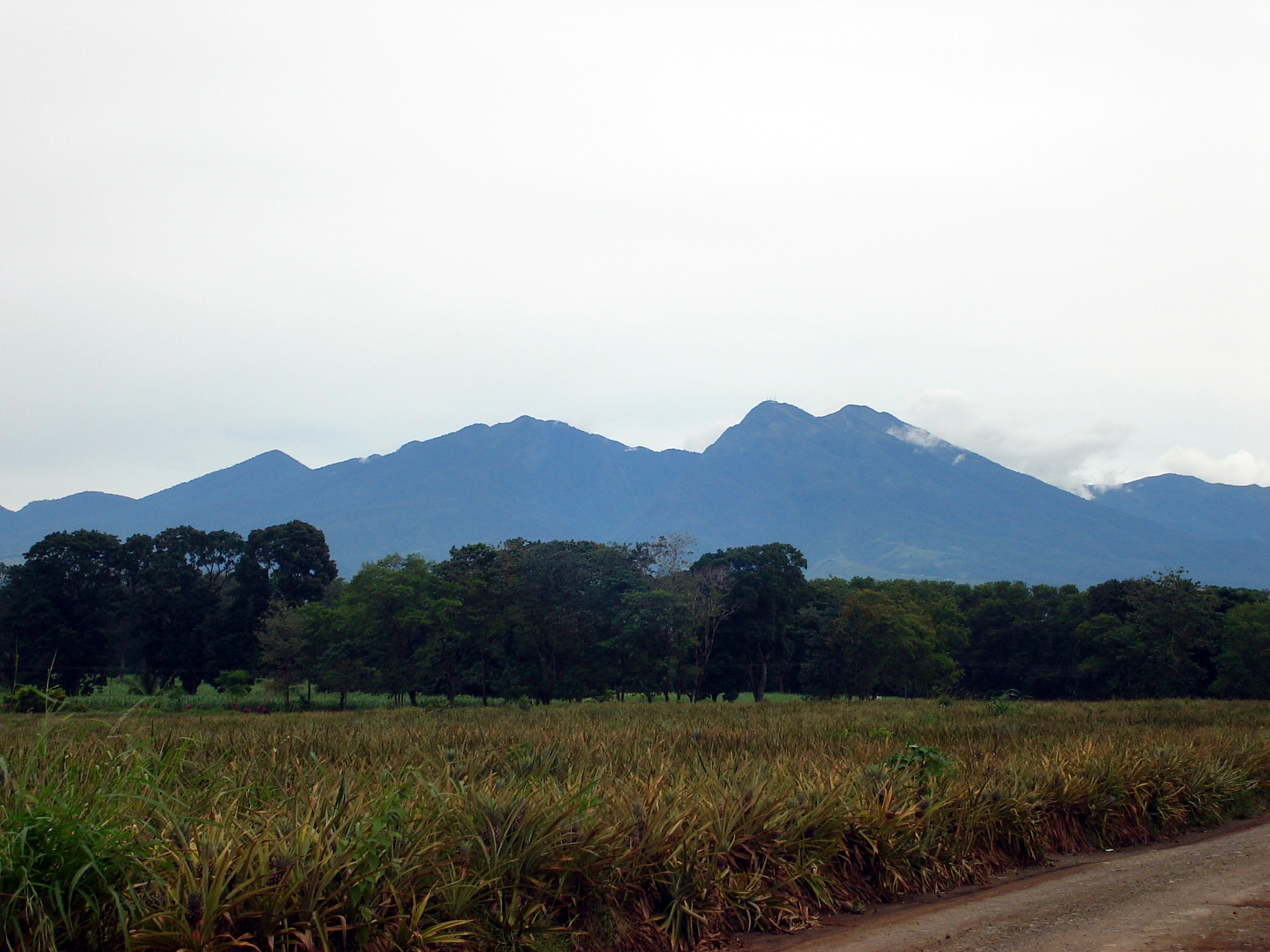
The Mount Kitanglad Range Natural Park straddles the territories of Dalwangan, Capitan Angel, Imbayao, and Mapayag.

=== North Highway District ===
The North Highway District is the largest in terms of land area and is composed of nine barangays. However, Sumpong is usually grouped within Poblacion because of its proximity to the district.

Barangay	Classification	Population (2015)
Can-ayan	Rural	5,870
Capitan Angel	Rural	1,160
Dalwangan	Rural	7,004
Imbayao	Rural	1,833
Kalasungay	Urban	8,272
Kibalabag	Rural	1,158
Manalog	Rural	969
Patpat	Rural	3,833
Sumpong	Urban	9,302
Total		39,401

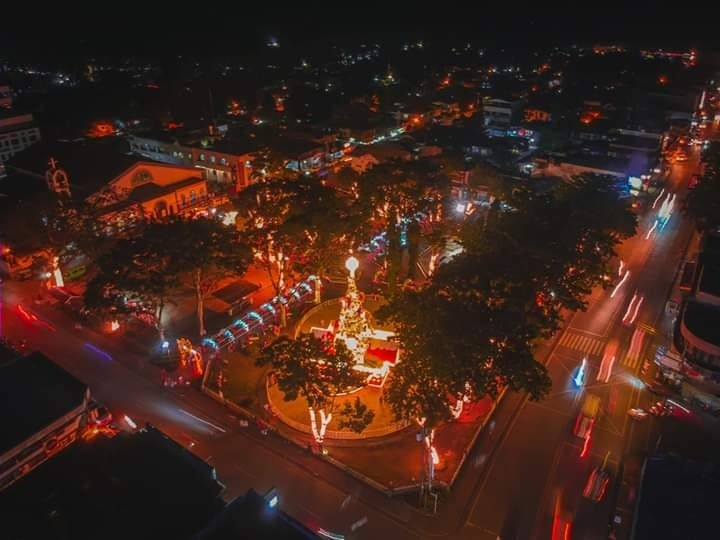
Malaybalay city plaza

=== Poblacion District ===
It is the city center of Malaybalay and is subdivided into eleven barangays.

Barangay	Classification	Population (2020)
Barangay 1	Urban	6,442
Barangay 2	Urban	587
Barangay 3	Urban	438
Barangay 4	Urban	344
Barangay 5	Urban	71
Barangay 6	Urban	474
Barangay 7	Urban	1,891
Barangay 8	Urban	579
Barangay 9	Urban	9,189
Barangay 10 (Impalambong)	Urban	3,447
Barangay 11 (Impalambong)	Urban	3,034
Total		26,494

=== South Highway District ===
It is the most populous district in the city, composed of eight barangays. Casisang is usually grouped with the Poblacion District because of its proximity.

Barangay	Classification	Population (2015)
Aglayan	Urban	7,594
Bangcud	Urban	5,120
Cabangahan	Rural	3,015
Casisang	Urban	25,696
Laguitas	Rural	3,233
Magsaysay	Rural	3,009
Mapayag	Rural	979
San Jose	Urban	6,856
Total		55,485

=== Upper Pulangi District ===
Upper Pulangi is located on the east of the city along the Pulangi River. It is composed of eight barangays.

Barangay	Classification	Population (2015)
Busdi	Rural	2,377
Caburacanan	Rural	1,150
Indalasa	Rural	1,690
Kulaman	Rural	1,341
Mapulo	Rural	1,260
Saint Peter	Rural	2,324
Silae	Rural	2,629
Zamboanguita	Rural	1,667
Total		14,438

== Defunct Barangays ==
Defunct barangays are those historically integrated as a regular barrio of Malaybalay but was later dissolved to form part of another barangay or were merged to form a new barangay. This has been the case of Barangay Poblacion where it was dissolved to form twenty new barangays and then reorganized to form the current eleven barangays of the Poblacion District. In 1972, then Mayor Timoteo Ocaya implemented the subdivision of Barangay Poblacion, including Impalambong, by virtue of Presidential Decrees no. 86, 86A, and 210. This created twenty new barangays from Poblacion, based on the purok system, where purok leaders were appointed as provisional Barangay Chairmen. The system proved to be cumbersome and unwieldy which led to the Municipal Council of Malaybalay to pass Ordinance No. 87 in 1974, downsizing the number of barangays to eleven. New borders were drawn such that some of the barangays are merged, parceled out to other barangays, or split. Impalambong, a sitio of Poblacion, was split into Barangay 18, Barangay 19, and Barangay 20 in 1972. By 1974, the new ordinance redesignated Barangay 18 as Barangay 10 and merged Barangay 19 and Barangay 20 to form Barangay 11. In the town proper, Barangay 1 and Barangay 6 were merged to form Barangay 1; Barangay 13, Barangay 14, and Barangay 17 were merged to form Barangay 7; Barangay 15 was dismembered to form parts of the present-day Barangay 6 and Barangay 8. The current designation (i.e. number) of barangays of Poblacion District was not necessarily designated as the number it was originally assigned in 1972. Furthermore, the dissolution of Barangay Poblacion in 1972 and its subsequent reorganization in 1974 led to the creation of the Administrative District of Poblacion when Malaybalay was converted into a city in 1998.

== Former Barangays ==
Malaybalay used to be larger and comprised roughly the area of the present-day Second Congressional District of Bukidnon except for Impasug-ong and the southern half of San Fernando. Throughout the 1950s to the 1970s, some of the far-flung, populated barrios of Malaybalay were separated from it to form part of a new municipality. These barangays now form part of the municipalities of San Fernando (1959), Valencia (1961), Lantapan (1968), and Cabanglasan (1979). The chart below lists the barrios formerly part of Malaybalay but are now part of other local government units.

List of Former Barangays of Malaybalay
Barrio	Today part of	Legal Basis	Comments
Abihid	San Fernando	Executive Order no. 347 (1959)	Part of the present-day Barangay Malayanan
Halapitan	San Fernando	Executive Order no. 347 (1959)	Designated municipal center (Poblacion) of San Fernando
Kalagutay	San Fernando	Executive Order no. 347 (1959)	Part of present-day Barangay Mabuhay
Little Baguio	San Fernando	Executive Order no. 347 (1959)	
Malambago	San Fernando	Executive Order no. 347 (1959)	Part of present-day Barangay Magkalungay
San Alfonso (Tugop)	San Fernando	Executive Order no. 347 (1959)	Present-day Barangay Tugop (RA 6489 listed Tugop as part of Cabanglasan; currently, Tugop is under the jurisdiction of San Fernando)
Sinalanganan	San Fernando	Executive Order no. 347 (1959)	
Tagaalas-as	San Fernando	Executive Order no. 347 (1959)	
Bagontaas	Valencia	Executive Order no. 360 (1959)	
Cawayanon	Valencia	Executive Order no. 360 (1959)	Renamed Vintar as per RA 5289
Guinoyuran	Valencia	Executive Order no. 360 (1959)	
Laligan	Valencia	Executive Order no. 360 (1959)	
Lilingayon	Valencia	Executive Order no. 360 (1959)	
Lumbayao	Valencia	Executive Order no. 360 (1959)	
Lurugan	Valencia	Executive Order no. 360 (1959)	
Maapag	Valencia	Executive Order no. 360 (1959)	
Mailag	Valencia	Executive Order no. 360 (1959)	
San Isidro	Valencia	Executive Order no. 360 (1959)	
Sugod	Valencia	Executive Order no. 360 (1959)	
Talisayan	Valencia	Executive Order no. 360 (1959)	No barangay of Valencia is currently named Talisayan
Tongantongan	Valencia	Executive Order no. 360 (1959)	
Valencia	Valencia	Executive Order no. 360 (1959)	Redesignated as Barangay Poblacion of Valencia
Alanib	Lantapan	Executive Order no. 119 (1964), RA 4787 (1966)	
Baclayon	Lantapan	Executive Order no. 119 (1964), RA 4787 (1966)	
Balila	Lantapan	Executive Order no. 119 (1964), RA 4787 (1966)	
Bantuanon	Lantapan	Executive Order no. 119 (1964), RA 4787 (1966)	
Basac	Lantapan	Executive Order no. 119 (1964), RA 4787 (1966)	
Bugcaon	Lantapan	Executive Order no. 119 (1964), RA 4787 (1966)	
Kaatuan	Lantapan	Executive Order no. 119 (1964), RA 4787 (1966)	
Kibangay	Lantapan	Executive Order no. 119 (1964), RA 4787 (1966)	
Kibogtong	Lantapan	Executive Order no. 119 (1964), RA 4787 (1966)	No barangay of Lantapan is currently named Kibogtong
Kulasihan	Lantapan	Executive Order no. 119 (1964), RA 4787 (1966)	
Lantapan	Lantapan	Executive Order no. 119 (1964), RA 4787 (1966)	Designated town proper (Poblacion) of Lantapan
Songco	Lantapan	Executive Order no. 119 (1964), RA 4787 (1966)	
Victory	Lantapan	Executive Order no. 119 (1964), RA 4787 (1966)	
Bobonawan	Cabanglasan	RA 6489	May refer to Sitio Valderrama (Valsons) of Barangay Imbatug, Cabanglasan
Cabanglasan	Cabanglasan	RA 6489	Designated town proper (Poblacion) of Cabanglasan
Cabulohan	Cabanglasan	RA 6489	
Capinonan	Cabanglasan	RA 6489	
Dalacutan	Cabanglasan	RA 6489	
Freedom	Cabanglasan	RA 6489	
Iba	Cabanglasan	RA 6489	
Imbatug	Cabanglasan	RA 6489	
Lambagan	Cabanglasan	RA 6489	
Mandahican	Cabanglasan	RA 6489	
Mandaing	Cabanglasan	RA 6489	
Mauswagon	Cabanglasan	RA 6489	
Omalao	Cabanglasan	RA 6489	Currently a sitio of Barangay Freedom
Paradise	Cabanglasan	RA 6489	
Tugop	Cabanglasan	RA 6489	Present-day Barangay Tugop (RA 6489 listed Tugop as part of Cabanglasan; currently, Tugop is under the jurisdiction of San Fernando)

== Sitios ==
Sitios are territorial enclaves in a barangay that may be organized and incorporated and functions in similar capacity as a purok. However, they are not local government units. With its large number of barangays and a large area, Malaybalay has numerous sitios—some of which are highly organized and have functional quasi-governmental bodies. Most sitios sprung in the 1980s as a result of logging activities and the subsequent migration of natives from the barangay centers to the hinterlands. In the 1990s and well into the 21st century, some sitios experienced depopulation, including some becoming uninhabited (as in the case of Sitios Talahidan and Sambukan of Barangay Caburacanan).

List of Sitios of Malaybalay
Sitio	Barangay	Comments
Lower Kapayawan (Aglayan Proper)	Aglayan	
Mahayahay	Aglayan	
Upper Aglayan (Lukdo)	Aglayan	
Upper Kapayawan	Aglayan	
Biyo	Apo Macote	
Calawag	Apo Macote	
Dapulan	Apo Macote	
Lagaan	Apo Macote	
Mahinog	Apo Macote	
Panganduan	Apo Macote	
Pangian	Apo Macote	
Bendum	Busdi	
Danaw	Busdi	
Maasam	Busdi	
Mahawan	Busdi	
Nabag-o	Busdi	
Nabawang	Busdi	
Nahigit	Busdi	
Tagaytay	Busdi	
Tubigon	Busdi	
Sambukan	Caburacanan	
Talahidan	Caburacanan	
Candiisan	Can-ayan	
Gantulan	Can-ayan	
Incalbog	Can-ayan	
Kabayugan	Can-ayan	
Kiito	Can-ayan	
Kilap-agan	Can-ayan	
Lanipga	Can-ayan	
Ronquillo	Can-ayan	
Tag-ilanao	Can-ayan	
Tagalolo	Can-ayan	
Taguican Valley	Can-ayan	
Tigbawan	Can-ayan	
Tintinaan	Can-ayan	
Gabunan	Casisang	
Kibarok	Casisang	
Kinugotan	Casisang	
Landing	Casisang	Subdivided into many puroks
Natid-asan	Casisang	
Santa Ana	Casisang	
Santa Cruz	Casisang	
Upper Gabunan	Casisang	
Damitan	Dalwangan	
Green Valley	Dalwangan	
Hill Tribe	Dalwangan	
Inhandig	Dalwangan	
New Ilocos	Dalwangan	
Tongantongan	Dalwangan	
Ulanguhon	Dalwangan	
Kulasihan	Imbayao	
Sinaburan	Imbayao	
Balaisan	Indalasa	
Banderawan	Indalasa	
Lupoklupok	Indalasa	
Mindagulus	Indalasa	
Pinangampuan	Indalasa	
Selib	Indalasa	
Umayam	Indalasa	
Digemen	Kalasungay	Part of Purok 4
Karangkarang	Kalasungay	Incorporated as Purok 5
Lumayagan	Kalasungay	Part of Purok 4
Malinao	Kalasungay	Part of Purok 4
Sagay	Kalasungay	Part of Purok 4
Wakat	Kalasungay	Part of Purok 4
Anuling	Kibalabag	Part of Baganao
Baganao	Kibalabag	
Kalib	Kibalabag	
Lamana	Kibalabag	
Lagaslasan	Kulaman	Incorporated as Purok 7
Balangbang	Laguitas	
Kiocab	Laguitas	
Manlungay	Laguitas	
Cabacungan	Linabo	Incorporated as Purok 3
Kidalag	Linabo	
Lalawan	Linabo	Incorporated as Purok 4
Paiwaig	Linabo	
Upper Lalawan	Linabo	Part of Lalawan
Bendolan	Magsaysay	
Bagongsilang	Maligaya	
Dumayas	Maligaya	
Guitaan	Maligaya	
Anduhon	Managok	
Angel	Managok	
Binatunan	Managok	
Langasihan	Managok	
Relis	Managok	
Umbawan	Managok	
Kugonkugon	Manalog	
Kalabasahon	Mapayag	
Tamugawi	Mapayag	
Tuburan	Mapulo	The current seat of government of Mapulo.
Upper Mapulo	Mapulo	It was the former seat of government of Mapulo; it has since transferred to Tuburan.
Alimpulos	Miglamin	
Dungis	Miglamin	
Lunocan	Miglamin	
Maranhog	Miglamin	
Matangpatang	Miglamin	
Migue	Patpat	
Pal-ing	Patpat	
Impalambong	Poblacion	This former sitio is now composed of two regular barangays: Barangay 10 and Barangay 11.
Limon	Poblacion	Incorporated as Purok 5 of Barangay 9.
Balaudo	Saint Peter	Chartered as part of Agusan del Sur; legally incorporated into Malaybalay.
Mahayag	Saint Peter	
Min-agdaw	Saint Peter	
Pinuwakan	Saint Peter	
Sumagibo	Saint Peter	
Tawantawan	Saint Peter	
Mabuhay	San Jose	
Panamucan	San Jose	
Santo Niño	San Jose	
Macurol	San Martin	
Sosoon	San Martin	
San Marcos	Santo Niño	
Kibalabag	Silae	
Nalumusan	Silae	
Crossing Silae	Silae	
Minlantao	Silae	
Salindungaw	Silae	
Binalbagan	Simaya	
Purais	Simaya	
Malapgap	Sinanglanan	
San Roque	Sinanglanan	
Santa Rita	Sinanglanan	
Ayahay	Sumpong	Part of Purok 4
Bongbongon	Sumpong	
Kisaray	Sumpong	
Kimambong	Sumpong	
Lumalambong	Sumpong	
Malandeg	Sumpong	
Balongkot	Violeta	
Kinuaw	Zamboanguita	
Lower Malilong	Zamboanguita	
Upper Malilong	Zamboanguita	
