= Sinanglanan =

Settlement in the Philippines

- Barangay
- Map of Mindanao showing the location of Sinanglanan Sinanglanan (Philippines)
- Coordinates: 7°59′37″N 125°11′55″E
- Country: Philippines
- Province: Bukidnon
- City: Malaybalay
- District: Basakan
- Barangayhood: 1951

Government
  - Type: Barangay Council
  - Body: Sangguniang Barangay
  - Chairman: Nilo Palma Aldeguer
- Elevation: 333 m (1,093 ft)

Population (2015 census)
  - Total: 3,262
- PSGC: 101312064
- IRA: ₱ 4.019 million (2021)

APO MACOTE is a rural barangay in the Basakan District of Malaybalay, Bukidnon, Philippines. According to the 2015 census, it has a population of 3,262 people. It is bordered to the north by San Martin, to the east by Miglamin and Jasaan of the Municipality of Cabanglasan, to the south by Apo Macote, and to the west by Santo Niño.

It was a sitio of Linabo until 1951, where it was converted into a barangay along with San Martin.
