= Silae =

Settlement in the Philippines

- Barangay
- Map of Mindanao showing the location of Silae Silae (Philippines)
- Coordinates: 8°09′32″N 125°16′57″E
- Country: Philippines
- Province: Bukidnon
- City: Malaybalay
- District: Upper Pulangi
- Barangayhood: 1856

Government
  - Type: Barangay Council
  - Body: Sangguniang Barangay
  - Chairman: Erlinda V. Castañares
- Elevation: 510 m (1,670 ft)

Silae is a rural barangay in the Upper Pulangi District of Malaybalay, Bukidnon, Philippines. It is bordered to the north by Mapulo, to the east by Indalasa separated by the Pulangi River, to the south by the barangays of Iba, Poblacion, Dalacutan, and Freedom of the Municipality of Cabanglasan, and to the west by Can-ayan.

Silae is mainly an agricultural village with corn as its principal crop. It serves as the entry point to the Upper Pulangi District from both Can-ayan and Cabanglasan.

It was one of the oldest barrios in Bukidnon, being part of the town of Sevilla in the province of Misamis under the Spanish Empire, with its seat at Linabo. In 1907, the American colonial government reorganized the country and established the Municipality of Malaybalay, dissolving the town of Sevilla. This saw a transfer of administrative seat from Linabo to Oroquieta (now Poblacion, Malaybalay).
