= Mapulo =

Settlement in the Philippines

- Barangay
- Map of Mindanao showing the location of Mapulo Mapulo (Philippines)
- Coordinates: 8°11′16″N 125°17′44″E
- Country: Philippines
- Province: Bukidnon
- City: Malaybalay
- District: Upper Pulangi
- Barangayhood: 1960

Government
  - Type: Barangay Council
  - Body: Sangguniang Barangay
  - Chairman: Menson Singatao, Jr.

Area
  - Total: 14.25 km^{2} (5.50 sq mi)
- Elevation: 512 m (1,680 ft)

Population (2015 census)
  - Total: 1,260
  - Density: 88.4/km^{2} (229/sq mi)
- PSGC: 101312035
- IRA: ₱ 2.396 million (2021)

Mapulo is an urbanizing barangay in the Upper Pulangi District of Malaybalay, Bukidnon, Philippines. According to the 2015 census, it has a population of 1,260 people.

It is bordered to the north by Caburacanan, to the east by Zamboanguita and Indalasa, to the south by Silae, and to the west by Can-ayan. It was a sitio of Silae until 1960, when Republic Act 3590 was implemented.
