= Santo Niño, Malaybalay =

Settlement in the Philippines

Santo Niño Kabegén Cabugon
- Barangay
- Map of Mindanao showing the location of Santo Niño Santo Niño (Philippines)
- Coordinates: 7°58′39″N 125°09′58″E
- Country: Philippines
- Province: Bukidnon
- City: Malaybalay
- District: Basakan
- Barangayhood: 1986

Government
  - Type: Barangay Council
  - Body: Sangguniang Barangay
  - Chairman: Jimmy Edama
- Elevation: 317 m (1,040 ft)

Population (2015 census)
  - Total: 1,675
- PSGC: 101312061
- IRA: ₱ 2.733 million (2021)

Santo Niño (Binukid: Kabegén) is a rural barangay in the Basakan District of Malaybalay, Bukidnon, Philippines. According to the 2015 census, it has a population of 1,675 people. It is bordered to the north by Simaya and San Martin, to the east by Sinanglanan and Apo Macote, to the south by Nabag-o of the City of Valencia, and to the west by Bangcud and Mailag.

It is an agricultural village where rice is a major product. It was formerly known as Cabugon or Kabegén which means a place of fruit bats and was converted into a barangay in 1986 by virtue of Republic Act no. 3590.
