= Ligkayan Bigkay =

Filipina environmentalist and community leader (died 2023)

Bai Bibyaon Ligkayan Bigkay
- Died: 20 November 2023
- Occupations: Community leader, environmentalist
- Years active: 1994–2023
- Known for: Advocacy for Manobo ancestral lands and the Pantaron Mountain Range

Bai Bibyaon Ligkayan Bigkay (died 20 November 2023) was a Filipino Lumad leader and environmentalist. She was the first and only female chieftain in the history of the Manobo people and has been described as "Mother of the Lumads". She was an advocate of indigenous peoples' rights and had been a defender of Manobo ancestral lands and the Pantaron Mountain Range from 1994.

Most Lumad elders do not know the exact date of their birth, but Bigkay was estimated to be around 80 years old as of 2019, though upon her death on 20 November 2023, it was stated that she was 90.

== Leadership ==
In 1986, Bigkay took part in the Mindanao Peoples Federation Assembly in response to threats of ethnocide. During the assembly, participants resolved to use "Lumad" as a unifying term referring to the 18 ethnolinguistic Indigenous peoples of Mindanao.

Bigkay campaigned to preserve the Pantaron Mountain Range, which is home to one of the largest remaining virgin forests in the Philippines and has been a target for logging and mining operations. The range also supplies water to major rivers in Mindanao, including the Mindanao River, Pulangi River, Davao River, Tagoloan River, and major tributaries of Agusan River. In 1994, sought by tribal leader Datu Guibang Apoga of the Talaingod Davao del Norte, she led the Manobo against intrusion by logging company Alcantara and Sons. She was among the leaders that opposed logging operations that would have destroyed Manobo ancestral lands in Talaingod, Davao del Norte. In the decades since then, she had continued alongside other Datus in defending indigenous communities of the Pantaron range against exploitation and militarization.

Bigkay led her people as they faced ethnocide, during their 2014 flight to UCCP Haran in Davao City after the Philippine military and paramilitary group Alamara attacked Manobo communities in Talaingod and Bukidnon. She also inspired other protests, such as the Manilakbayan ng Mindanao protest camp and caravan, and Sandugo, a national alliance of Moro and indigenous peoples of the Philippines. ("Sandugo" is a Visayan word which means "one blood".)

She organized other female indigenous leaders, forming the Sabokahan to mo Lumad Kamalitanan (Confederation of Lumad Women), and helped expand the Salugpungan Ta Tanu Igkanugon Learning Center, which now runs 50 schools for indigenous children. Bigkay also helped create the national Indigenous peoples' organization Katribu Kalipunan ng Katutubong Mamamayan ng Pilipinas.

== Awards and recognition ==
Bigkay received the University of the Philippines Gawad Tandang Sora award in 2017 for leadership in indigenous peoples' struggle for human rights and dignity. She was hailed as "the Tandang Sora of the countryside… the Mother of the Lumads who inspires the revolution of the Filipino people for national self-determination and freedom." The award is named after Tandang Sora, the "Mother of the Philippine Revolution", as an exemplar of patriotism and service to Filipinos.

Bigkay was also recognized as the Most Distinguished Awardee of the 5th Gawad Bayani ng Kalikasan (Hero of the Environment Award) in 2018.

She received the 2019 Ulirang Nakatatanda Award from the Coalition of Services of the Elderly. She was also given the Ginetta Sagan Award by Amnesty International USA in 2022.

Bigkay's honorific, Bai, is reserved for Mindanaon women of stature, and Bibyaon is Bigkay's title as chieftain of her tribe.

Posthumous tributes were given to Bigkay and botanist Leonard Co during the Gulay Pa More festival of heritage food and indigenous agriculture held on May 25, 2024, at the University of the Philippines campus in Quezon City.

== In art and literature ==
Bigkay and Sharmaine Dausay, Bigkay's grandniece and Sabokohan youth leader, are the subject of the novel We Call Her Ina Bai, published in 2021. Bigkay is featured in the children's book Sayaw ng Pantaron, also published in 2021.

In 2023, the images of Bigkay, Whang-Od, Gabriela Silang, and Tandang Sora became part of a mural sponsored by the Bayanihan Center in Southeast Portland.
