= Zamboanga =

Zamboanga may refer to:

- Zamboanga (province), a former province of the Philippines
- Zamboanga City, a highly urbanized city located on Mindanao, Philippines
- Zamboanga Peninsula, an administrative region in the Philippines and a peninsula projecting westward from Mindanao comprising these provinces:
  - Zamboanga del Norte
  - Zamboanga del Sur
  - Zamboanga Sibugay
  - Sulu
- Republic of Zamboanga, a revolutionary republic that existed in 1899–1903
- Zamboanga (film), a 1937 feature film

== See also ==
- Zamboanguita, a municipality in Negros Oriental, Philippines
- Zamboanguita, Malaybalay, a barangay in Malaybalay, Bukidnon, Philippines
