= Kibalabag =

- Barangay
- Location within Mindanao mainland Location within Philippines
- Coordinates: 8°14′46.0″N 125°10′34.2″E
- Country: Philippines
- Province: Bukidnon
- City: Malaybalay
- District: North Highway District
- Barangayhood: 1910

Government
  - Type: Barangay Council
  - Body: Sangguniang Barangay
  - Chairman: Shemuel D. Lagunday

Area
  - Total: 52.2 km^{2} (20.2 sq mi)
- Elevation: 1,347 m (4,419 ft)

Population
  - Total: 1,158
  - Density: 22.2/km^{2} (57.5/sq mi)
- PSGC: 101312021
- IRA (2020): Php 2,160,587

Kibalabag is a rural barangay in the North Highway District of Malaybalay, Philippines. As of 2015, it has a population of 1,158 people.

It is bounded to the north and west by Manalog, to the northeast by Busdi, to the east by Kulaman and Caburacanan, to the south by Can-ayan, and to the southwest by Sumpong. It is characterized by densely forested and mountainous terrain, with a deep gorge carved by the Kibalabag River running lengthwise through the barangay. The Kibalabag River is the major source of potable water for the entire Malaybalay. It eventually empties into the Tagoloan River which forms its southwestern boundary with Sumpong. Kibalabag can be roughly divided into four sitios. Kibalabag Proper to the north is the most populous and the seat of the barangay government. Sitio Baganao is a village on a small plateau in the central portion of the barangay. To the east lies the hinterland sitio of Lamana and Larapan. The southern portion is Sitio Kalib on the boundary with Can-ayan. Mount Kiamû is a prominent mountain shared by Kibalabag and Manalog. The mountain hosts endemic species of pitcher plants, metallophytes, and other wildlife. The majority of the population are Higaunen (Higaonon); Kibalabag is entirely within the Bukidnon-Higaonon Tribal Association (BUHITA) ancestral domain claim. The barangay is primarily agricultural, with corn, root crops, abaca, banana, and onions being the major products. It was founded in 1910 as barangay Bangkal but was renamed in 1965 into Kibalabag.
