= Saint Peter, Malaybalay =

Saint Peter Sumpilen
- Barangay
- Map of Mindanao showing the location of Saint Peter, Malaybalay Saint Peter, Malaybalay (Philippines)
- Coordinates: 8°14′45.2″N 125°18′1.7″E
- Country: Philippines
- Province: Bukidnon
- City: Malaybalay
- District: Upper Pulangi
- Barangayhood: 1972

Government
  - Type: Barangay Council
  - Body: Sangguniang Barangay
  - Chairman: Rubencio T. Organiza, Sr.

Area
  - Total: 31.86 km^{2} (12.30 sq mi)
- Elevation: 657 m (2,156 ft)

Population (2015)
  - Total: 2,324
  - Density: 72.94/km^{2} (188.9/sq mi)
- PSGC Code: 101312058

Saint Peter (Binukid: Sintpiter; Sumpilen, in Cebuano orthography Sumpilon) is a rural barangay in the Upper Pulangi District of Malaybalay City, Bukidnon. It is situated 63 kilometres northeast of the city proper, on the east bank of the Pulangi River. According to the 2015 census, it has a population of 2,324 people.

== Geography ==
Saint Peter is bounded to the north by Busdi, to the east by the province of Agusan del Sur, to the south by Zamboanguita and Caburacanan, and to the west by Kulaman. It is subdivided into eleven purok and four sitios. The sitios are Mahayag, Pinuwakan, Tawantawan, and Balaudo. Saint Peter is an entry point to Sitio Bendum of Barangay Busdi.

It is situated between the Pulangi River and the Pantaron Range and is characterized by a mountainous terrain and dense forests. It is drained by the Tigpaniki and Namnam rivers, which ultimately flows into the Pulangi River. Like the rest of the Pantaron Range, Saint Peter also hosts a diverse wildlife, including some endemic species of trees, plants, birds, and mammals. Four new species of pitcher plant were recently discovered in Sitio Mahayag and Sitio Balaudo.

== Socio-economic profile ==
Situated in the hinterlands of central Mindanao, Saint Peter is a relatively poor community relying on agriculture as its chief economic activity. Rice, corn, abacá, coffee, and rubber are the chief crops produced there. There is a well-maintained road leading into Saint Peter from Zamboanguita and there are hanging bridges from Caburacanan and Kulaman across the Pulangi River. In the education sector, Saint Peter is under the administration of the Division of Malaybalay City in District X. There are three elementary schools, two of which are schools for indigenous peoples. These are Saint Peter Elementary School in the village proper, Pigpamulahan Elementary School in Mahayag, and Yandang Elementary School in Balaudo. There is also one high school, Saint Peter National High School, which was recently separated from its mother school in Silae. The peace and order situation in the village is not good, some of its sitios are sometimes raided by the rebel New People's Army who use these hamlets to traverse into the Caraga Region, threatening the peace and order of the community. This led to the local government to declare such group as persona non grata.

== History ==
The natives call the area of what is now Saint Peter as Sumpilen or Sumpilon. It was settled by the Higaonon people as a hamlet which eventually grew into a sitio of the much older community of Caburacanan. According to folk history, it was Datù Lauman Aninayon who founded the village. Later, Catholic and Protestant missionaries proselytized the Upper Pulangi area and converted the populace. The name of the village was changed as a result of a joke when then-Malaybalay Mayor Lorenzo Dinlayan and the provincial warden Pedro Abunda asked for the real name of the village, to which the people replied "Pedro". After an actual deliberation of the name change, the name "Saint Peter" was agreed to commemorate the Christian influence on the community. In 1972, as per Republic Act 3590, the village of Saint Peter—formerly Sumpilen—was separated from Caburacanan and converted as a regular barangay of Malaybalay
