= Busdi =

Busdì
- Barangay
- Map of Mindanao showing the location of Busdi Busdi (Philippines)
- Coordinates: 8°16′55.4″N 125°15′11″E
- Country: Philippines
- Province: Bukidnon
- City: Malaybalay
- District: Upper Pulangi
- Founded: 1885

Government
  - Type: Barangay Council
  - Body: Sangguniang Barangay
  - Chairman: Bernard L. Dumala, Sr.

Area
  - Total: 153.82 km^{2} (59.39 sq mi)
- Elevation: 627 m (2,057 ft)

Population (2015)
  - Total: 2,377
  - Density: 15.45/km^{2} (40.02/sq mi)
- PSGC: 101312003
- IRA: Php 3,562,874

Busdi (Binukid: Busdì) is a rural barangay of the Upper Pulangi District of Malaybalay, Bukidnon, Philippines. According to the 2015 census, it has a population of 2,377 people. It is bounded to the north by Barangay Bulonay of Impasug-ong, to the east by the Municipality of La Paz, Agusan del Sur, to the south by Saint Peter and Kulaman, and to the west by Kibalabag and Manalog.

== Geography ==
Busdi is located between the Tago and Pantaron mountain ranges and is therefore characterized by mountainous and hilly landscape with the Pulangi River forming a valley in between the ranges where the village proper is situated. The western portion is a highland part of Mount Tago Range and is characterized by cloud forests (saldab) and primary forests (puwalas). The east is part of the Pantaron Range which forms a natural boundary between the provinces of Bukidnon and Agusan del Sur. Major rivers found in Busdi include the Pulangi, Adgaoan, Namnam, and Saludinganun. Busdi lies in an important watershed area of the Pulangi River and Mount Tago which is considered as a critical area for the conservation of biodiversity.

Due to the large territory of Busdi, several sitios are within its jurisdiction. The largest is Sitio Bendum, on the east across the Pulangi River. It was recognized as a sitio of Busdi in 1980 but due to its location, it has developed a closer association with Barangay Saint Peter. To its north lies Sitio Nabag-o. Sitio Tubigon is located in the south on the border with Kulaman. Near the boundary with Bulonay are the sitios of Mahawan, Nabawang, and Nahigit.

== Socio-economic profile ==
Busdi is inhabited mainly by Higaunen or Higaonon people and the entire village is within the Bukidnon Higaonon Tribal Association (BUHITA) ancestral domain claim. The Higaunen (or in Cebuano orthography, Higaonon) are one of the least known ethnolinguistic groups in Mindanao. Busdi is primarily agricultural where rice and corn are the major products. Abacá, coffee, and rubber are also grown there as alternative livelihood. A section of the Malaybalay-Gingoog Road passes through Busdi; the same section is part of the Agusan-Malaybalay Road. There is one public school in the village which provide elementary and secondary education. There is also a Jesuit-operated school in Bendum which provides basic cultural education.
