= Manalog =

Barangay of Malaybalay City, Philippines

- Barangay
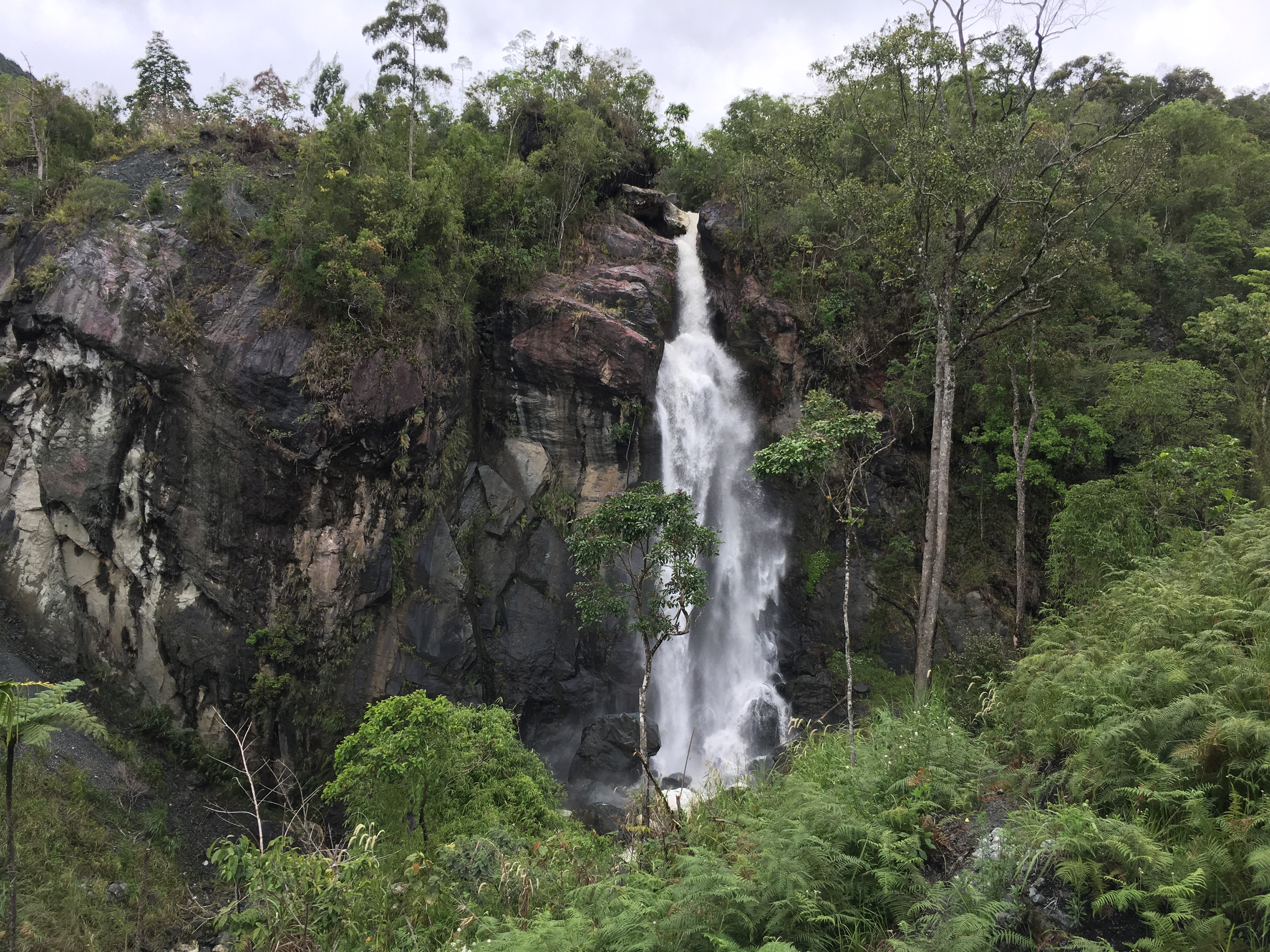
- Kinapuntan (Hasaán) Falls in Barangay Manalog, Malaybalay, Philippines

- Map of Mindanao showing the location of Manalog Manalog (Philippines)
- Coordinates: 8°17′39″N 125°09′16″E
- Country: Philippines
- Province: Bukidnon
- City: Malaybalay
- District: North Highway District
- Barangayhood: 1950

Government
  - Type: Barangay Council
  - Body: Sangguniang Barangay
  - Chairman: Norbie S. Lagunday

Area
  - Total: 67.05 km^{2} (25.89 sq mi)
- Elevation: 1,802.3 m (5,913 ft)

Population (2015 census)
  - Total: 969
  - Density: 14.5/km^{2} (37.4/sq mi)
- PSGC: 101312032
- IRA: ₱ 2.16 million (2021)

Manalog (Binukid: Báriyu Manalug) is a rural barangay of the North Highway District of Malaybalay City, Bukidnon, in the Philippines. According to the 2015 census, it has a population of 969 people. It is the northernmost village in Malaybalay, bounded to the north by Barangay Dumalaguing and Barangay Bulonay of Impasugong, to the east by Busdi, to the south by Kibalabag, to the southwest by Kalasungay (separated by the Tagoloan River), and to the west by Barangay Bontongon of Impasugong. Its inhabitants are mostly native Higaunons (Higaunen in Binukid orthography) who has a legal ancestral domain claim in the area. In fact, Manalog is entirely within the Bukidnon Higaonon Tribal Association's (BUHITA) Ancestral Domain.

Manalog is situated in northern Malaybalay along the Mount Tago Range. It is characterized with a mountainous terrain with deep valleys and steep cliffs. Primary (puwalas), secondary (kagulangan), mossy forests (saldab or lagiit), and brushlands (lubas) are found in Manalog. This makes Manalog one of the last areas in the Philippines with forest cover and an important watershed area. Manalog is dotted with many waterfalls with the Kinapuntan Falls as one of the most popular.

Abacá is a major crop in Manalog and handicrafts involving weaving abacá fibers is a major livelihood among the villagers. Manalog is the only major abacá producer in Northern Mindanao.
