= Kalasungay =

Settlement in the Philippines

- Barangay
- Map of Mindanao showing the location of Kalasungay Kalasungay (Philippines)
- Coordinates: 8°10′14.4″N 125°6′19.4″E
- Country: Philippines
- Province: Bukidnon
- City: Malaybalay
- District: North Highway District
- Barangayhood: 1845

Government
  - Type: Barangay Council
  - Body: Sangguniang Barangay
  - Chairman: Rodrigo O. Niere

Area
  - Total: 59.60 km^{2} (23.01 sq mi)
- Elevation: 700 m (2,300 ft)

Population (2020)
  - Total: 9,961
  - Density: 167.1/km^{2} (432.9/sq mi)
- PSGC: 101312019
- IRA (2020): Php 7,532,624

Kalasungay (Spanish: Calasungay) is an urban barangay in the North Highway District of Malaybalay, Bukidnon, along the Sawaga River. According to the 2015 census, it has a population of 8,272 people.

== Geography ==
Kalasungay is located 3 km west of the city proper. It is bounded to the north by the Tugisan and Tagoloan rivers, separating it from Impalutao and Manalog, respectively. It is bounded to the east by Sumpong and Impalambong; to the south by Casisang and Imbayao; to the southwest by Capitan Angel; and to the west by Dalwangan and Patpat by the Sawaga River and Kabakahan Creek, respectively. It is subdivided into eight purok. The Sawaga River bisects Kalasungay into a hilly and forested northern half and a gently rising southern half which touches the foothills of the Kitanglad Mountain Range. The forests of northern Kalasungay is a project of the Bukidnon Forests, Incorporated in a consortium with the New Zealand government. The southern half is classified as agricultural land.

== Socio-economic profile ==
According to the Comprehensive Land Use Plan of the city government, Kalasungay is planned as an agricultural and industrial zone aimed to "limit the expansion of poultries [sic] and piggeries". Areas along the Sayre Highway are dedicated for commercial and residential purposes. Agriculture is the major source of livelihood of the people. Corn, sugarcane, coffee, pineapple, and vegetables are the primary crops produced. Poultry and hog farms are located throughout the outskirts of the village, which also provide employment to the locals. Due to its proximity to the Poblacion District, commerce is a growing activity. A significant fraction of the population is employed in the service sector. Kalasungay has a well-maintained road network leading into and out of the barangay, with the Sayre Highway as a major thoroughfare. A new by-pass road from San Jose to Dalwangan aimed to divert traffic to avoid congestion in Poblacion District passes by Kalasungay in Sitio Karangkarang.

Kalasungay has one public elementary school and one high school, all of them administered by the Department of Education, Division of Malaybalay City District I. These are Kalasungay Central School and Kalasungay National High School.

== History ==
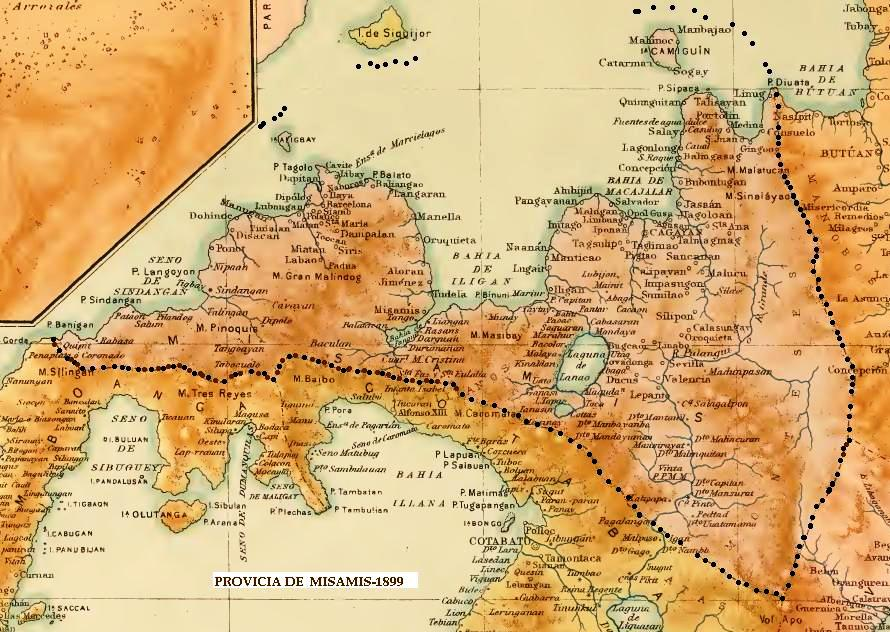
Map of Misamis in 1899, showing barrio Calasungay.

According to the accepted historical narrative of Kalasungay, the Higaonon people started to occupy the Lumayagan Creek in northern Kalasungay from the Tagoloan River around the time of the Spanish occupation of Mindanao. The community was then called Galnarahán, which means "a place of pomelo (garnada)" in Binukid, due to the abundance of pomelo in the area. The word garnada came from Spanish granada, which means pomegranate, a fruit that looks similar to pomelo as far as the Higaonon were concerned. Galnarahán was closely associated with Sil-ipen, an old name for Dalwangan

In one event, two carabao bulls were locking horns and in an effort to separate them, the village chieftain was fatally gored. The phrase "Kalabaw nagsungay!" (Binukid: The carabao gored him!) was purportedly said by the witnesses about the event to other villagers. The phrase was then corrupted into kala-sungay, which has been used to describe the area where the event occurred and eventually included Galnarahán altogether. These events are anecdotal, and no further reference supports or refutes the narrative.

In the early 19th century, the Spaniards had had contact with the natives in Kalasungay, and eventually incorporated the village as part of the province of Misamis in 1845. In 1850, Kalasungay was reportedly burned down in a skirmish between the natives and the Spaniards. In the narrative published in the website of the city of Malaybalay, the Spaniards burned down the village in a battle against the natives, even going as far as to claim there are atrocities committed. However, the historical narrative presented in the 2015 Citizen's Charter published by the city government stated that Kalasungay was burned down by the natives themselves as a result of an earlier atrocity in 1845; furthermore, it stated that there was no open warfare. In June 15, 1877, Kalasungay was integrated into Oroquieta del Interior, a pueblo encompassing the present-day Bukidnon province.
