= San Martin, Malaybalay =

Barangay in Bukidnon, Philippines

San Martin
- Barangay
- Map of Mindanao showing the location of San Martin San Martin (Philippines)
- Coordinates: 8°00′01″N 125°11′45″E
- Country: Philippines
- Province: Bukidnon
- City: Malaybalay
- District: Basakan
- Barangayhood: 1951

Government
  - Type: Barangay Council
  - Body: Sangguniang Barangay
  - Chairman: Sergio Fiel

San Martin is a rural barangay in the Basakan District of Malaybalay, Bukidnon, Philippines. It is bounded to the north by Managok, to the east by Miglamin, to the south by Sinanglanan and Santo Niño, and to the west by Simaya. San Martin is characterized by a flat terrain with a hilly and rugged terrain in its northern and eastern boundary dominated by Mount Capistrano, a popular attraction in the city, shared with Simayà and Managok. It was a sitio of Linabo known as Macatol until 1951 when it became a regular barrio of Malaybalay.

== Climate ==
The area has a tropical rainforest climate according to the Köppen climate classification (Af), which is prevalent across most of the island of Mindanao. The climate is characterized by high temperatures throughout the year, high humidity, and regular rainfall, with no clearly defined dry season. Temperatures typically range between 22 and 30 °C. The area experiences peak rainfall from May to October, while precipitation is relatively lower during the remaining months of the year, without a complete cessation.
