= Sumpong, Malaybalay =

Settlement in the Philippines

Sumpong
- Barangay
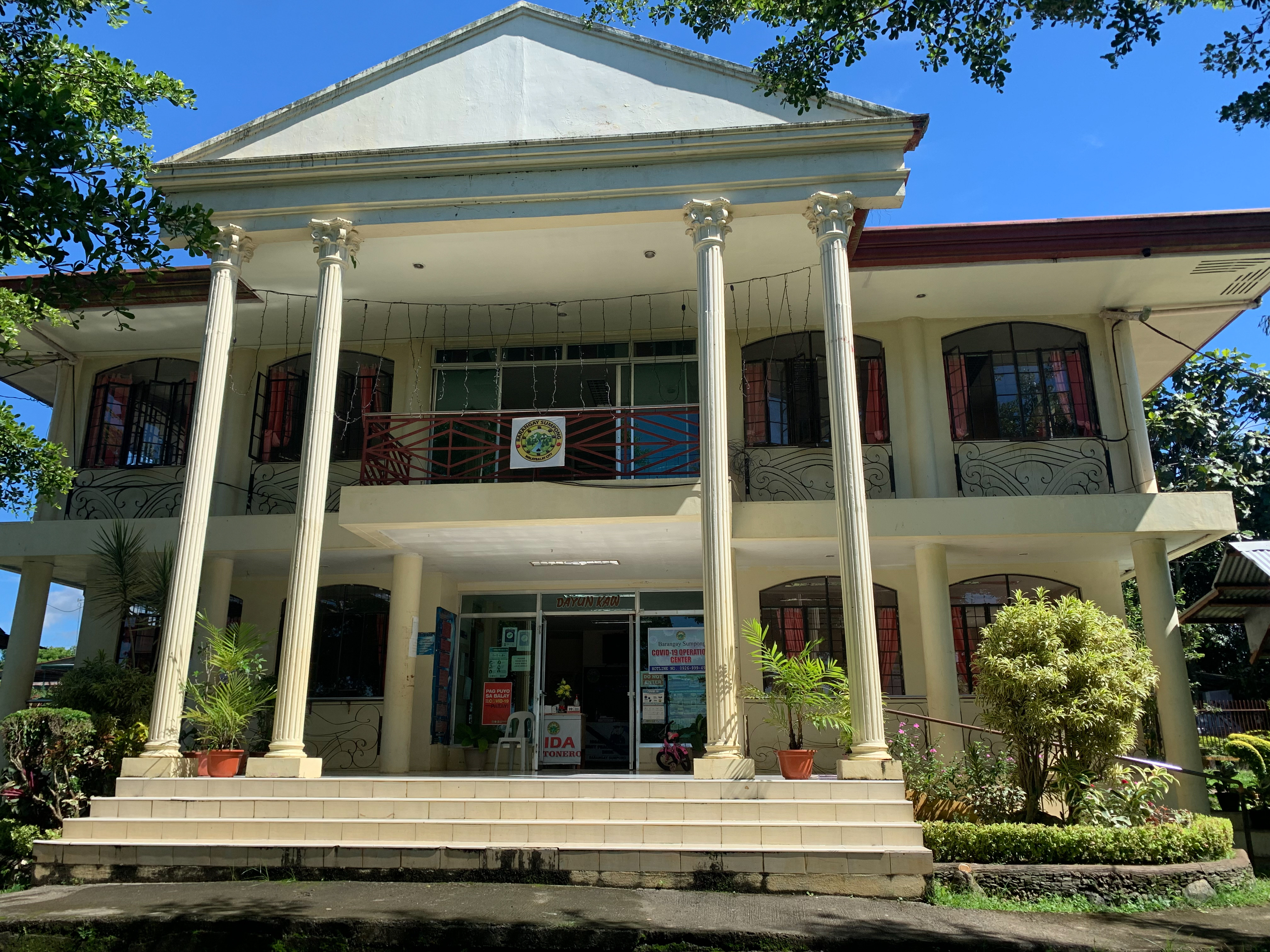
- Sumpong Barangay Hall
- Coordinates: 8°3′11.5″N 125°8′7.4″E
- Country: Philippines
- Province: Bukidnon
- City: Malaybalay
- District: North Highway District

Government
  - Type: Barangay Council
  - Body: Sangguniang Barangay
  - Chairman: Velemar Recarte

Area
  - Barangay: 18.30 km^{2} (7.07 sq mi)
  - Urban: 5.77 km^{2} (2.23 sq mi)
- Elevation: 674 m (2,211 ft)

Population (2015)
  - Barangay: 9,302
  - Density: 508.3/km^{2} (1,317/sq mi)
- PSGC: 101312065
- IRA (2020): Php 8,310,414

Sumpong is an urban barangay of the City of Malaybalay in the Province of Bukidnon, Philippines. According to the 2015 census, Sumpong has a population of 9,302 people. It is bounded to the north by Kibalabag, to the east by Can-ayan, to the south by the Poblacion District, and to the west by Kalasungay.

== Geography ==
The population of Sumpong is mostly concentrated to the south on the boundary with the Poblacion District; the sparsely populated north is mountainous and is forested. The bulk of Sumpong's forestland is maintained by the Provincial Tree Park Management and the Bukidnon Forests, Inc; the forestland is an important watershed area. The Tagoloan River forms its northern boundary with Kibalabag while the Sawaga River forms the boundary with Impalambong to the south. It is subdivided into ten purok:

- Purok 1 (Suna Village)
- Purok 2
- Purok 3
- Purok 4 (including Sitio Ayahay)
- Purok 5
- Purok 6 (Bongbongon)
- Purok 7
- Purok 8 (Midland)
- Purok 9 (Lumalambong)
- Purok 10 (Sitio Kisaray)

== Socio-economic profile ==
Commerce is the chief economic activity in the barangay due to its proximity to the city proper. The 2012-2022 Comprehensive Land Use Plan of the Malaybalay City government places Sumpong as a "center of services cluster". Bethel Baptist Hospital is the only major healthcare institution in the barangay. There is one public elementary school, the Sumpong Central School administered by the Department of Education. There are several private schools in Sumpong that offers elementary and secondary education:

- Bethel Baptist Christian Academy, in Purok 1
- Lifehouse Christian Academy, in Purok 5
- Malaybalay United Methodist Church Ecumenical Pre-school, in Purok 3
- Marywoods Academy, in Purok 8
- Welcome Home Foundation, Inc. School for the Deaf, in Purok 1

== History ==
The area around the Migkayagan River (today known as Tagoloan River) is considered as a sacred place for the indigenous peoples' community because it was the birthplace of tribal laws and customs. It was mostly settled by the Higaunen (Higaonon) people, who called the area Sumpong. In the mid-19th century, the Spanish integrated the community under the pueblo of Oroquita del Interior, as a sitio of Malaybalay. At the start of the 20th century, then Governor Manolo Fortich, upon orders of the American colonial administration, relocated the community near Malaybalay. The people submitted to the directive, but they still called their new village Sumpong. It was organized into a barrio, with Datu Mandupila (Juan Luminton) as its first teniente del barrio. It was formally organized as a barangay in 1961.
