= Caburacanan =

- Barangay
- Map of Mindanao showing the location of Caburacanan Caburacanan (Philippines)
- Coordinates: 8°12′50.2″N 125°16′39.2″E
- Country: Philippines
- Province: Bukidnon
- City: Malaybalay
- District: Upper Pulangi

Government
  - Type: Barangay Council
  - Body: Sangguniang Barangay
  - Chairman: Joven L. Salonga

Area
  - Total: 32.73 km^{2} (12.64 sq mi)
- Elevation: 365 m (1,198 ft)

Population (2015)
  - Total: 1,150
  - Density: 35.1/km^{2} (91.0/sq mi)
- PSGC: 101312007
- IRA (2020): Php 2,154,546.

Caburacanan (Binukid: Kaburakanan) is a rural barangay of the Upper Pulangi District in Malaybalay City, Bukidnon, Philippines. According to the 2015 census, it has a population of 1,150 people, making it the least populated village in Upper Pulangi. It is bounded to the north by Kulaman, to the east by Saint Peter and Zamboanguita, to the south by Mapulo, and to the west by Can-ayan and Kibalabag. The western part of the village is mountainous with vast old-growth forests and the east is a valley along the Pulangi River, where the village proper is found. The population is mostly Higaunen (Higaonon in Cebuano orthography). It had two sitios under its jurisdiction which are now abandoned: Sambukan, a hamlet to the north; and Talahidan, on the west. Caburacanan has one elementary school administered by the Department of Education, Division of Malaybalay City

The name Caburacanan is a hispanicization of the Binukid word kaburakanan which roughly translates to a place of burakan (Decalobanthus peltatus), a vine of the morning glory family.
