= Miglamin =

- Barangay
- Location in Mindanao Location in the Philippines
- Coordinates: 8°2′19.9″N 125°14′34.1″E
- Country: Philippines
- Province: Bukidnon
- City: Malaybalay
- District: Basakan

Government
  - Type: Barangay Council
  - Body: Sangguniang Barangay
  - Chairman: Elegio S. Palluto

Area
  - Total: 32.51 km^{2} (12.55 sq mi)
- Elevation: 468 m (1,535 ft)

Population (2015)
  - Total: 3,188
  - Density: 98.06/km^{2} (254.0/sq mi)
- PSGC: 101312028
- IRA (2020): Php 3,693,513

Miglamin is a rural barangay in the Basakan District of Malaybalay, Bukidnon, Philippines. According to the 2015 census, it has a population of 3,188 people.

== Geography ==
Miglamin is a long strip of territory in the southeastern portion of the city that straddles the mountains between Malaybalay and Cabanglasan. It is bounded to the north by Linabo, Can-ayan and Capinonan, to the east by Lambagan, Imbatug, and Cabulohan, to the south by Paradise, Jasaan, and Apo Macote, and to the west by Maligaya, Managok, San Martin, and Sinanglanan. There are patches of rolling terrain and undulating plains. It has several sitios within its jurisdiction; these are Dungis and Matangpatang in the north, Alimpulos in the east, and Lunukan and Maranhug in the south.

== Socio-economic Profile ==
Agriculture is the major economic activity in the barangay where rice, corn, sugarcane, and vegetables are the primary crops. It also serves as an entry point to the city from Cabanglasan and thus has a well-maintained road system. It has three public elementary schools located in the village proper, Matangpatang, and Lunukan; it has one secondary school which offers both junior and senior high school education. Miglamin was once a sitio of Barangay Imbatug and became a barangay by virtue of Republic Act no. 3590 and when Imbatug was separated from Malaybalay to form the municipality of Cabanglasan.
