= Patpat =

Patpat Lapu-Lapu
- Barangay
- Location within Mindanao mainland Location within Philippines
- Coordinates: 8°11′45.6″N 125°3′50.4″E
- Country: Philippines
- Province: Bukidnon
- City: Malaybalay
- Districts: North Highway District

Government
  - Type: Barangay Council
  - Body: Sangguniang Barangay
  - Chairman: Renante M. Okit

Area
  - Total: 46.92 km^{2} (18.12 sq mi)
- Elevation: 855 m (2,805 ft)

Population (2015)
  - Total: 3,833
  - Density: 81.69/km^{2} (211.6/sq mi)
- PSGC: 101312025.
- IRA (2020): Php 4,180,576

Patpat is the de facto name for barangay Lapu-Lapu of Malaybalay City, Philippines. As of the 2015 census, it has a population of 3,833 people.

== About ==
Patpat is located in the North Highway District and is bounded to the north by Impalutao of the Municipality of Impasug-ong, to the east and south by Kalasungay, to and to the west by Dalwangan. It is characterized by undulating plains in the south and a mountainous terrain in the north, dotted with waterfalls such as the Tugisan and Salaysay (Migue) falls. The bulk of Patpat's territory is grassland and is classified as agricultural land. According to the 2012-2022 Comprehensive Land Use Plan of the city government, Patpat is reclassified into an agri-industrial cluster to host poultry and hog farms. There is one public elementary school; secondary education is provided by schools in neighboring Kalasungay and Dalwangan, with some students even enrolling in the schools in Poblacion

The barangay was renamed into Lapu-Lapu in 1967 by virtue of Republic Act No. 5087 but the name Patpat is still commonly used and the renaming is unknown to most of the residents. Therefore, in all government documents, the village is designated as Patpat with the de jure name Lapu-Lapu in parentheses.
