= Dalwangan =

Settlement in the Philippines

Dalwangan Báriyu Daluwangan
- Barangay
- Map showing the location of Dalwangan in the Philippines Dalwangan (Philippines)
- Coordinates: 8°12′04.9″N 125°02′31″E
- Country: Philippines
- Province: Bukidnon
- City: Malaybalay
- District: North Highway District
- Barangayhood: March 26, 1915

Government
  - Type: Barangay Council
  - Body: Sangguniang Barangay
  - Chairman: Raul B. Pandong

Area
  - Total: 68.25 km^{2} (26.35 sq mi)
- Elevation: 1,087 m (3,566 ft)

Population
  - Total: 7,004
  - Density: 102.6/km^{2} (265.8/sq mi)
- Demonym: Daluwanganen
- PSGC: 101312014
- IRA (2020): Php 6,575,112

Dalwangan (Binukid: Báriyu Daluwangan) is a barangay west of Malaybalay City situated on the foothills of the Kitanglad Range, 12 kilometers west of the city proper. It is bounded to the north by Impalutao of the municipality of Impasugong, to the east by Patpat and Kalasungay, to the south by Capitan Angel and the Mount Kitanglad Range Natural Park, and to the west by Kibenton of Impasugong. According to the 2015 census, Dalwangan has a population of 7,004 people.

== Geography ==
Dalwangan is one of the largest barangay of Malaybalay with an area of 68.25 square kilometres (26.35 square miles), 54.04% of which is classified alienable and disposable and the rest as forestland. The barangay is located along the Sayre Highway and is one of the urbanizing areas of the city. Most of its boundary with Impasug-ong is formed by the Ipoon Creek, starting from its headwaters at Mt. Kitanglad northwestward until it reaches the Dila River. Following the Dila River upstream forms the northern boundary of Dalwangan with Impalutao and Kibuwa. A small creek marks the boundary with Patpat to the east; the Sawaga River forms the rest of its eastern boundary with Kalasungay. To the south the Kalatugunan Creek marks the boundary between Dalwangan and Capitan Angel

Dalwangan is characterized with a flat and rolling terrain to the north and east, and gently sloping to mountainous to the south and west intermittently incised with deep gorges formed by the Sawaga, Ipoon, and Lalawan Rivers. Wide valleys can be found in the southern part of Dalwangan. The soil is characterized as clay loam.

=== Sitio and Purok ===
Dalwangan is composed of purok and sitio, some of which are distant from the village proper. The following are the sitio within the jurisdiction of Dalwangan:

- Damitan
- Green Valley
- Inhandig
- Lalawan
- Mangasa
- New Ilocos
- Sangaya
- Tongantongan
- Ulanguhon

== History ==
The name "Dalwangan" comes from Binukid which means "shed in a valley". The settlement of what is now Dalwangan was known as Sil-ipon, named after a creek less than a kilometer to the north of the village. The village was officially designated as a barrio in 1913 but was only organized by order of Bukidnon governor Manuel Fortich on March 26, 1915. Juanito Casinabe was appointed as its first teniente del barrio. Throughout the 20th century Dalwangan has been progressive as a result of its location along the Sayre Highway and the establishment of the Malaybalay Stock Farm and various government research institutions for agriculture.

List of Leaders of Dalwangan
| Leader | Year Appointed |
|---|---|
| Juanito Casinabe | 1913-1942 |
| Pedro Sumintan | 1942-1945 |
| Mauricio Bagiohan | 1945-1954 |
| Federico Daonlay | 1954-1960 |
| Benito Rojas, Sr. | 1964-1981 |
| Conrado Dumindin | 1982-1989 |
| Reneirey Martinez | 1990-2008 |
| Esperanza Martinez | 2008-2018 |
| Kathleen Cecille Pagaling | 2018-2019 |
| Raul Pandong | 2019–present |

== Economy ==
Dalwangan is primarily agriculture-driven with sugarcane, maize, pineapples, vegetables, and livestock as its primary resources. Privately owned farms and government institutions provide employment to the locals.

== Demography ==
According to the 2015 census, Dalwangan has a population of 7,004 people. Its population density is 100 people per square kilometer. The group with the highest population is aged 5 to 9. The population grew from 2,532 in 1990 to the present population, with an increase of 4,472 people. The census calculates a growth of 2.63% from the 2010 census

== Education ==
Public schools in Dalwangan are under the administration of the Department of Education, Division of Malaybalay City, specifically under Schools District I. There are three public elementary schools and one secondary school in Dalwangan. The following schools are:

- Dalwangan Elementary School
- Damitan Elementary School
- New Ilocos Elementary School
- Bukidnon National High School - Dalwangan Annex
