= Capitan Angel =

Capitán Ángel
- Barangay
- Location within Mindanao mainland Location within Philippines
- Coordinates: 8°08′52.2″N 125°1′19.1″E
- Country: Philippines
- Province: Bukidnon
- City: Malaybalay
- District: North Highway District
- Barangayhood: April 20, 1963

Government
  - Type: Barangay Council
  - Body: Sangguniang Barangay
  - Chairman: Marjun S. Mancila

Area
  - Total: 35.0 km^{2} (13.5 sq mi)
- Elevation: 1,286 m (4,219 ft)

Population (2015)
  - Total: 1,160
  - Density: 33.1/km^{2} (85.8/sq mi)
- PSGC: 101312010.
- IRA (2020): Php 2,162,097

Capitán Ángel is a rural barangay in the North Highway District of the city of Malaybalay, Philippines. It is situated entirely within the foothills of the Kitanglad Range. Formerly a sitio of Kalasungay, it achieved barangayhood on April 20, 1963, by virtue of Republic Act no. 3590 and was named after Ángel Casinabe, then the teniente del barrio of Kalasungay. According to the 2015 census, it has a population of 1,160 people.

The barangay is bounded to the north and northwest by the Lalawan River (a tributary of the Sawaga) separating it from Dalwangan; to the east, the line starting from the confluence of the Kalatugunan Creek and Sawaga River to the confluence of the Pamukulan and Kaulon Creeks separates Capitán Ángel from Kalasungay; to the south, the Pamukulan Creek separates it from Imbayao; and the west is delimited by the Kitanglad Range. Capitán Ángel is characterized with old growth forests (puwalas) and intermittent grasslands (lubas) where most of it is classified as agricultural land. Sugarcane, corn, and vegetables are grown and many livestock farms operate there. Politically, the barangay is subdivided into four purok. There is one public school which offers elementary and secondary education
