= Indalasa =

- Barangay
- Location within Mindanao mainland Location within Philippines
- Coordinates: 8°11′00.3″N 125°20′19.2″E
- Country: Philippines
- Province: Bukidnon
- City: Malaybalay
- District: Upper Pulangi
- Barangayhood: 1964

Government
  - Type: Barangay Council
  - Body: Sangguniang Barangay
  - Chairman: Gina S. Pailagao

Area
  - Total: 53.87 km^{2} (20.80 sq mi)
- Elevation: 606 m (1,988 ft)

Population (2015)
  - Total: 1,690
  - Density: 31.4/km^{2} (81.3/sq mi)
- PSGC: 101312018
- IRA (2020): Php 2,562,319

Indalasa (Binukid: Indalasà) is a rural barangay of Malaybalay, Philippines. It is located east of the city in the Upper Pulangi District. According to the 2015 census, it had a population of 1,690 people.

== Profile ==
Indalasa is bordered to the north by Zamboanguita, to the east by the Municipality of Loreto, Agusan del Sur, to the south by barangay Canangaan of Cabanglasan, Bukidnon, and to the west by barangay Silae and Mapulo. The Pantaron Range straddles its eastern boundary with Agusan del Sur, while its western boundary is formed by the Pulangi River. The village proper is on the northwest corner of the barangay near Mapulo. Sitio Lupuklupuk is in a valley in the central part of the barangay, Sitio Mindagulus to the north, and Sitio Umayam to the extreme east, along the headwaters of the Umayam River. Agriculture is the principal economic activity, with corn and rice as the major products. Most of the population are Dumagat, a Binukid term for coastal peoples, usually Visayans. These people entered the barangay during the logging period in the 1960s and stayed after the moratorium on logging in the 1980s. Nevertheless, Indalasa is the only barangay in Malaybalay to have a significant Umayamnon community.
