= Can-ayan =

Settlement in the Philippines

- Barangay
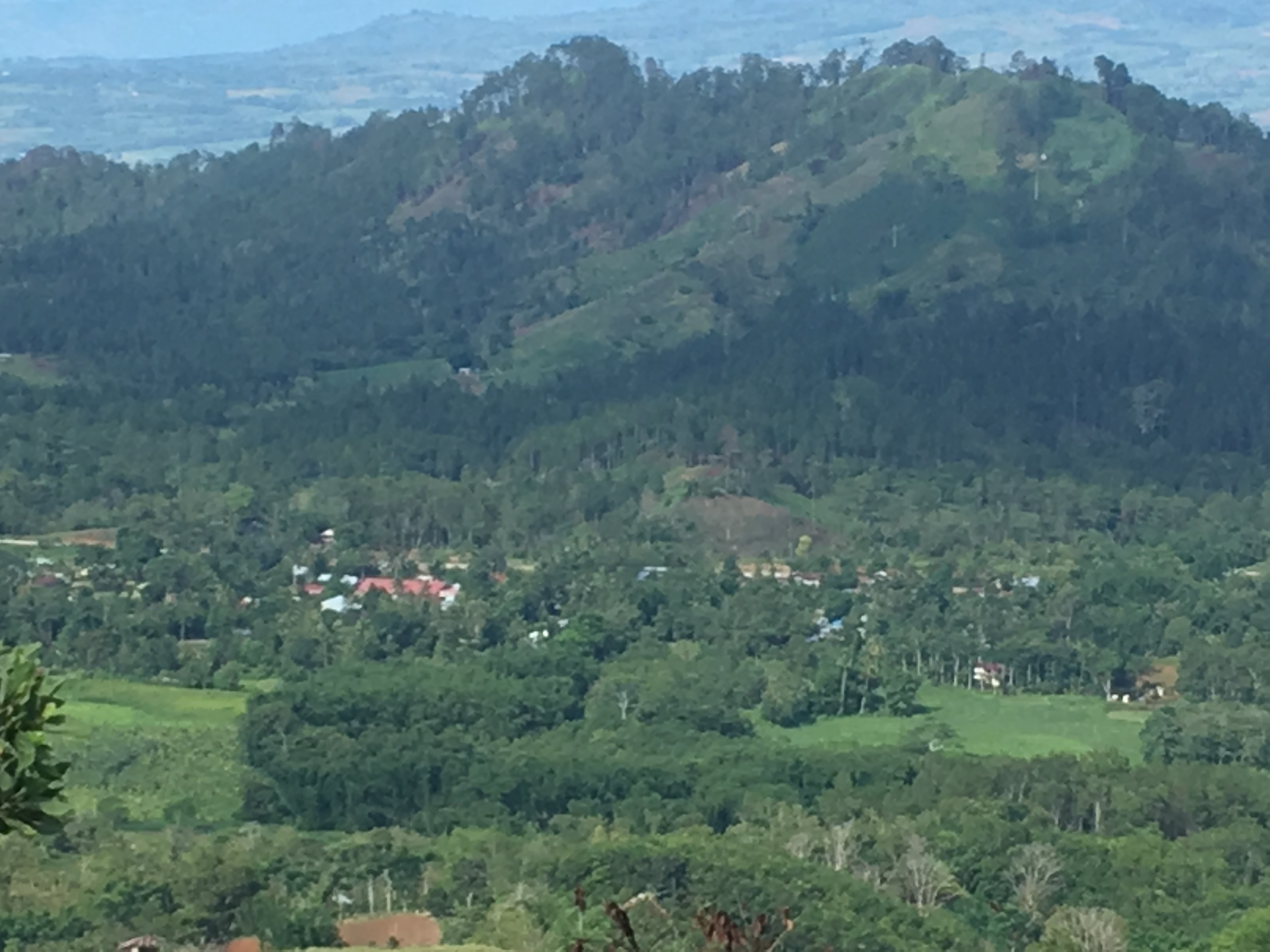
- Can-ayan proper as seen from Big Rock

- Location within Mindanao mainland Location within Philippines
- Coordinates: 8°11′15.1″N 125°9′24.7″E
- Country: Philippines
- Province: Bukidnon
- City: Malaybalay
- District: North Highway District

Government
  - Type: Barangay Council
  - Body: Sangguniang Barangay
  - Chairman: Rommel S. Seblian

Area
  - Total: 130.90 km^{2} (50.54 sq mi)
- Elevation: 668 m (2,192 ft)

Population (2015)
  - Total: 5,870
  - Density: 44.8/km^{2} (116/sq mi)
- Demonym(s): Kan-ayanen (Binukid), Can-ayanon (Cebuano)
- PSGC: 101312009
- IRA (2020): Php 5,718,788

Can-ayan (Binukid: Kan-ayán) is a rural barangay in the North Highway District of Malaybalay City, Bukidnon, Philippines. According to the 2015 census, Can-ayan has a population of 5,870 people.

== Location ==
The village is situated east of the Poblacion District on the headwaters of the Tagoloan River. With a territory of 130.90 square kilometres, it is one of the largest barangays in the city. It is bounded to the north by Kibalabag; to the east by Caburacanan, Mapulo, Silae, and Barangay Freedom of Cabanglasan; to the south by Miglamin, Linabo, and San Jose; and to the west by Casisang, the Poblacion District, and Sumpong. Can-ayan is characterized by a mountainous terrain and steep hills with intermittent flatland and valleys formed by the Tagoloan, Malas, Tigbawan, and Taguican Rivers. Most of the land is classified as forestland, at around 10,189 hectares; the remaining land is alienable and disposable.

The barangay is subdivided into five purok in the village proper and nine sitio scattered throughout its territory. These are:

- Can-ayan Proper
- Candiisan
- Gantulan
- Incalbog
- Kiito
- Kilap-agan
- Tagalolo
- Tag-ilanao
- Taguican
- Tigbawan
- Tintinaan

== Economy ==
Agriculture and forestry are the major economic activities of Can-ayan. There are several livestock farms operating in the barangay. Among the chief products include corn, rice, vegetables, and mushrooms. Can-ayan connects the Upper Pulangi District to the city proper through a secondary road traversing the barangay, offering an alternative route to the Aglayan-Zamboanguita Road.

== Education ==
There are several public elementary schools in the area and one high school, all of which are under the administration of the Department of Education Division of Malaybalay City, Schools Division II

- Can-ayan Integrated School
- Candiisan Elementary School
- Incalbog Elementary School
- Kilap-agan Elementary School
- Tag-ilanao Elementary School
- Tintinaan Elementary School

== History ==
Can-ayan was first settled by Higaonon people; under Spanish rule, the village was incorporated into the pueblo of Oroquita del Interior. Its first recorded teniente del barrio was Datù Ampelino Lito. The area served as a route to Silae, where Dominican and Jesuit missionaries established their communities there. Can-ayan maintained its organization even during the American and Japanese occupation of the country. After World War II, both the national and local governments gradually provided basic services to the village up to the present. With its growing population and the sprawl of urbanization from the city proper, Can-ayan is a prospective area for development.
