= Zamboanguita, Malaybalay =

Settlement in the Philippines

Zamboanguita Langga
- Barangay
- Location within Mindanao mainland Location within Philippines
- Coordinates: 8°12′9.1″N 125°17′45.6″E
- Country: Philippines
- Province: Bukidnon
- City: Malaybalay
- District: Upper Pulangi
- Barangayhood: March 4, 1985

Government
  - Type: Barangay Council
  - Body: Sangguniang Barangay
  - Chairman: Corazon T. Decano

Area
  - Total: 40.18 km^{2} (15.51 sq mi)
- Elevation: 769 m (2,523 ft)

Population (2015)
  - Total: 1,667
  - Density: 41.49/km^{2} (107.5/sq mi)
- PSGC: 101312067
- IRA (2020): Php 2,544,951.

Zamboanguita (Binukid: Langga) is a rural barangay in the Upper Pulangi District of the city of Malaybalay, Philippines. According to the 2015 census, it has a population of 1,667 people. It is bounded to the north by Saint Peter separated by the Tigpaniki Creek, to the east by the Municipality of La Paz, Agusan del Sur separated by the Pantaron Range, to the south by Indalasa separated by the Pagpag Creek and Mount Mintakdaw, and to the west by Caburacanan and Mapulo separated by the Pulangi River. Zamboanguita sits on a fertile valley between the Pulangi River and the Pantaron Range where most of its area is classified as forestland. It is primarily agricultural with a flourishing commercial activity. It has two sitios: Malilong and Kinuaw. Zamboanguita has one public elementary school, administered by the Department of Education, Division of Malaybalay

According to a narrative by the barangay government of Zamboanguita, the area was once known as Langga. In April 1956, then Malaybalay Mayor Lorenzo Dinlayan with his staff Alejandro Bansing and Teodoro Perino visited Langga to incorporate the village into the city. The village was then renamed into Zamboanguita at Perino's suggestion due to the houses being made up of samwang and his admiration for the city of Zamboanga. The name Zamboaguita is a Spanish diminutive of Zamboanga, in which the place literally means "Little Zamboanga." In 1968, Zamboanguita was incorporated as a sitio of Caburacanan and had an organized administration. On March 4, 1985, Zamboanguita was converted into a barangay by virtue of a municipal ordinance.
