= Pantaron Mountain Range =

Mountain range in Mindanao, Philippines

- Central Cordillera
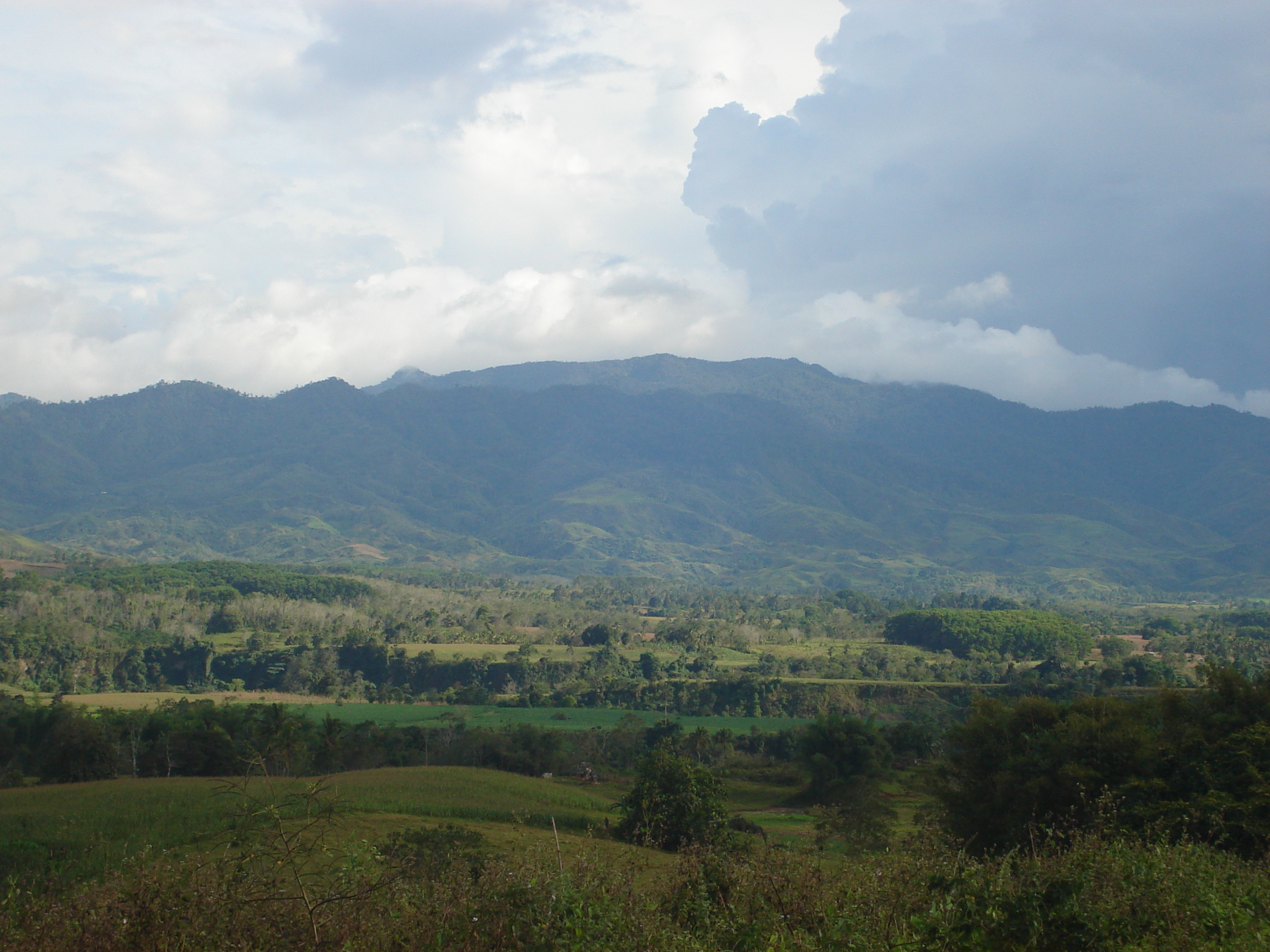

Highest point
- Coordinates: 7°44′35.02″N 125°25′49.01″E

Dimensions
- Length: 200 km (120 mi) NS
- Area: 12,600 km^{2} (4,900 mi^{2})

Geography
- Location within Philippines
- Country: Philippines
- Provinces: Misamis Oriental, Bukidnon, Agusan del Norte, Agusan del Sur, Davao del Norte and Davao del Sur
- Regions: Northern Mindanao, Caraga and Southern Mindanao

The Pantaron Mountain Range, also called the Central Cordillera of Mindanao, Philippines straddles across the provinces of Misamis Oriental, Bukidnon, Agusan del Norte, Agusan del Sur, Davao del Norte and Davao del Sur. The range contains one of the last remaining old growth or primary forest blocks in Mindanao. Major rivers on the island also have their headwaters on the mountain range, including Mindanao River, Pulangi River, Davao River, Tagoloan River and major tributaries of Agusan River.

The mountain range has been noted for its cultural and biological diversity. Ethnic tribal communities such as the Manobos, Higaonons, and Bukidnons are the inhabitants of the area. Ancestral domain claims within the boundaries of the mountain range have also been identified by the government for these Lumad minorities.

Pantaron Mountain Range is one of the Philippines' few remaining biodiversity corridors with old growth forests. It is home to rare species of flora and fauna, including the critically endangered Philippine eagle and of other endemic and vulnerable fauna such as the Philippine brown deer, the Philippine flying lemur, and a Mindanao-endemic gymnure. The forests are threatened by mining and logging.

== See also ==
- Nepenthes malimumuensis
- Nepenthes cabanae
- Bai Bibyaon Ligkayan Bigkay, environmentalist, defender of Manobo ancestral lands and the Pantaron Mountain Range
