= Apo Macote =

Settlement in the Philippines

- Barangay
- Map of Mindanao showing the location of Apo Macote. Apo Macote (Philippines)
- Coordinates: 7°58′34.9″N 125°12′27.4″E
- Country: Philippines
- Province: Bukidnon
- City: Malaybalay
- District: Basakan

Government
  - Type: Barangay Council
  - Body: Sangguniang Barangay
  - Chairman: Julie F. Olili

Area
  - Total: 29.10 km^{2} (11.24 sq mi)
- Elevation: 335 m (1,099 ft)

Population (2015)
  - Total: 4,903
  - Density: 168.5/km^{2} (436.4/sq mi)
- PSGC: 101312027
- IRA (2020): Php 4,988,571

Apo Macote is a rural barangay in the Basakan District of Malaybalay City, in the province of Bukidnon, Philippines. It is the southernmost barangay of Malaybalay. According to the 2015 census, Apo Macote has a population of 4,903 people.

== Profile ==
Apo Macote is located in the southern part of Malaybalay bounded to the north by Sinanglanan, to the east by Malayanan of the municipality of San Fernando, to the south by the Pulangi River which separates Apo Macote from Lumbayao, Sinabuagan, and San Isidro of Valencia City, and to the west by Santo Niño and Nabag-o. It is generally flat around the village proper and hilly along the eastern part. Most of the land is dedicated to agriculture, where rice is a major crop. Other crops include spices and vegetables. There is also a small grape farm in the village. A small fraction of its territory is forested which is maintained by the Department of Environment and Natural Resources under the Integrated Special Forest Management Program. Apo Macote is subdivided into seven purok and several sitios; the largest of them are Calawag and Dapulan. Calawag is situated along the Pulangi River across Lumbayao; Dapulan is on the east along the road to Malayanan. There are three elementary schools and one secondary school in Apo Macote, located in the village proper and in Dapulan and Calawag.

The village was named after its local chieftain Apù Makuti (in Spanish orthography, Apo Macote). It was first settled by native Higaunons. During the Japanese occupation of the Philippines, Apo Macote became a haven for refugees.
