= Kulaman =

- Barangay
- Barangay Kulaman
- Location within Philippines
- Coordinates: 8°14′24″N 125°15′47″E
- Country: Philippines
- Province: Bukidnon
- City: Malaybalay
- District: Upper Pulangi
- Established: April 25, 1972
- Seat: Buuy Nanganudan Building

Government
  - Type: Sangguniang Barangay
  - Barangay Captain: Jenny S. Subang

Area
  - Total: 30.49 km^{2} (11.77 sq mi)
- Elevation: 820 m (2,690 ft)

Population (2015)
  - Total: 1,341
  - Density: 43.98/km^{2} (113.9/sq mi)
- Demonym: Kulamanén

Kulaman is one of the 46 barangays of Malaybalay City. It is located in the Upper Pulangi District of the city, bounded to the north by Busdi, to the east by Saint Peter, to the south by Caburacanan, and to the west by Kibalabag. According to the 2015 census, Kulaman has a population of 1,341 people, making it one of the smallest in the district.

== Etymology ==
According to the residents, the name Kulaman is derived from the Binukid phrase hadi agkaulaman, which means "cannot be lowly regarded." This description was based on oral lore that the village could always repel attacks by other tribes and nomads, particularly the Magahat.

== History ==
According to the accepted history of the barangay, a Higaonon tribe settled in what is now Kulaman, led by Datù Mangawag. When he died, he was succeeded by Datù Nanganudan Mansiruna and then by Datù Mampunduwan, who incorporated the settlement into Barangay Caburacanan as a sitio. Mampunduwan was succeeded by Datù Sinaludu (or Sinaludo, in Cebuano orthography), whose legal name was Salvador Timbangan. Datù Sinaludu worked for the barangayhood of Kulaman. On April 25, 1972, through Municipal Ordinance No. 5 series of 1972 and Provincial Board Resolution No. 72-277, Kulaman was separated from Caburacanan and was officially incorporated as a barrio (barangay) of Malaybalay

== Geography ==
Kulaman has an estimated area of 30.49 square kilometers. It is mostly made up of mountainous forest, particularly in the western two-thirds; this is an economically important area because of the watersheds that provide water to the barangay and Malaybalay as a whole. The eastern third is part of the Upper Pulangi Valley; this is where the population resides and agricultural activity flourish.
