= Cabanglasan =

Municipality in Bukidnon, Philippines

- Municipality
- Municipality of Cabanglasan
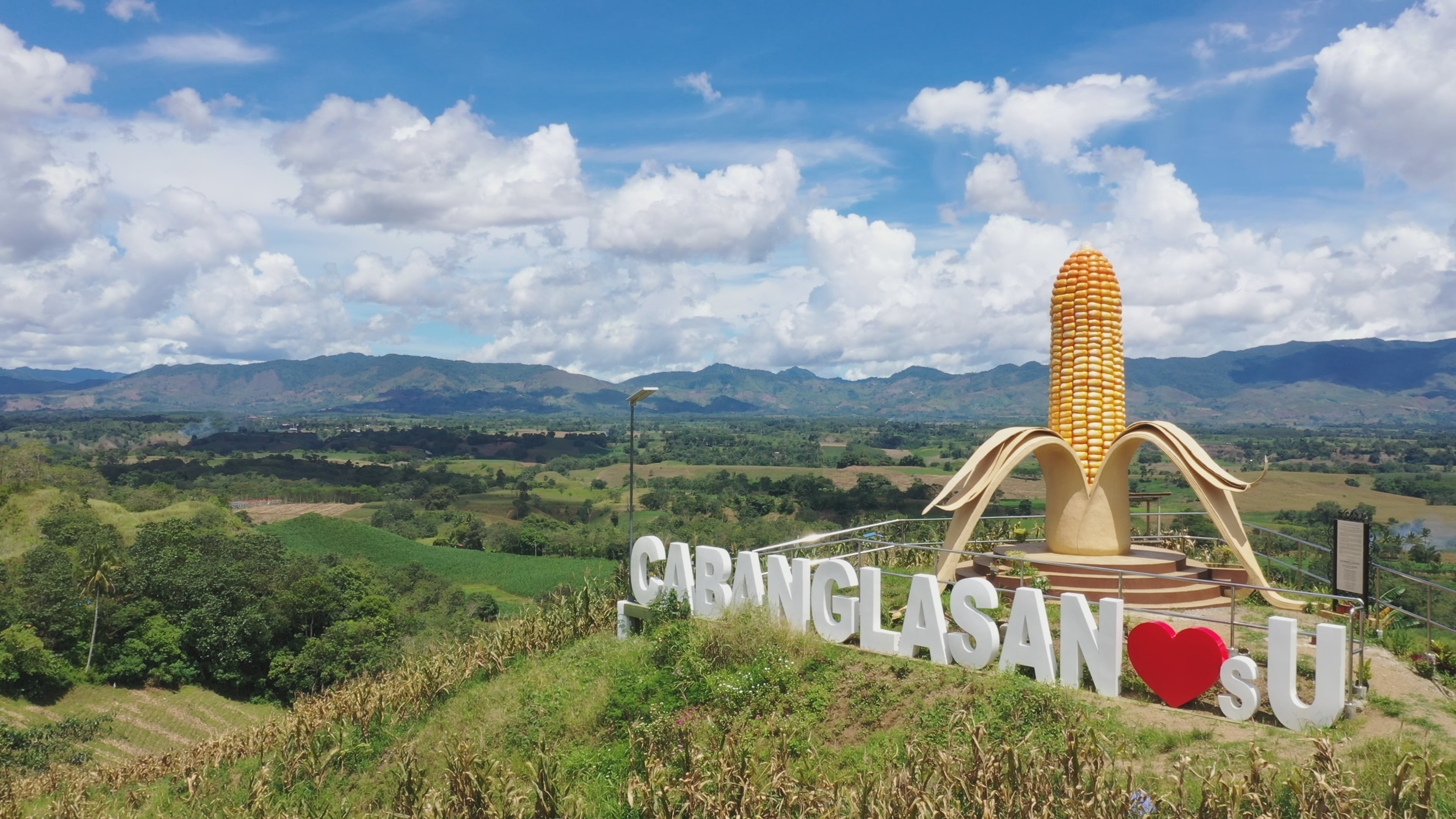
- View of Ear of Corn Landmark in Cabanglasan, Bukidnon

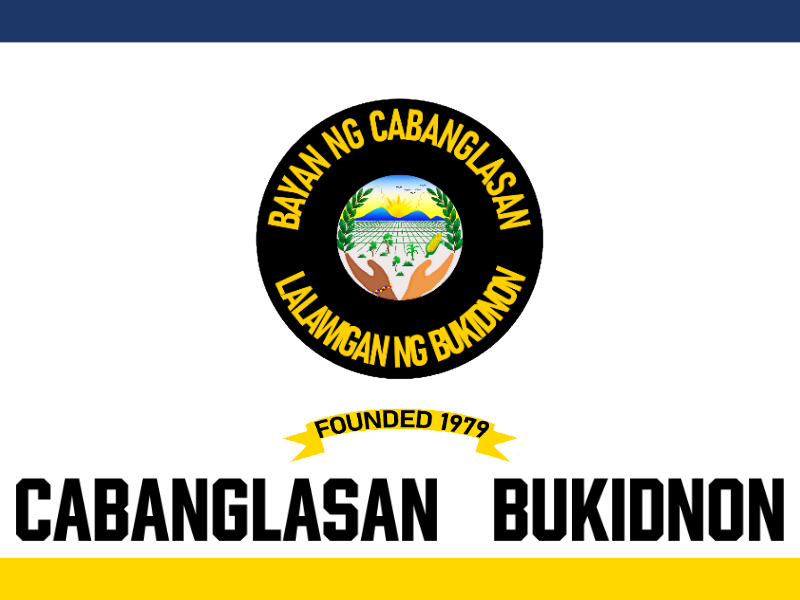
- Flag Seal

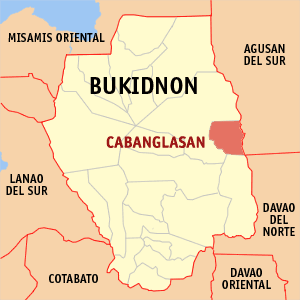
- Map of Bukidnon with Cabanglasan highlighted
- Interactive map of Cabanglasan
- Location within the Philippines
- Coordinates: 8°04′38″N 125°17′57″E
- Country: Philippines
- Region: Northern Mindanao
- Province: Bukidnon
- District: 2nd district
- Founded: August 13, 1979
- Barangays: 15 (see Barangays)

Government
  - Type: Sangguniang Bayan
  - Mayor: Bernie C. Castillanes
  - Vice Mayor: Lolita O. Bullecer
  - Representative: Jonathan Keith T. Flores
  - Municipal Council: Members: Frencis Jhean D. Butal; Jijo Butalid; Jenneth M. Politud; Reynard O. Encarguez; Nilo David Suarez; Dante G. Dela Mance; Evangeline S. Tamayo; Jeorge A. Ostan; Marcelo Vistal (ABC Pres); Dominador G. Dela Mance (Municipal IPMR); Gail Godwin A. Haligado (SK Federation Chairwoman)
  - Electorate: 24,225 voters (2025)

Area
  - Total: 243.30 km^{2} (93.94 sq mi)
- Elevation: 467 m (1,532 ft)
- Highest elevation: 809 m (2,654 ft)
- Lowest elevation: 385 m (1,263 ft)

Population (2024 census)
  - Total: 38,365
  - Density: 157.69/km^{2} (408.40/sq mi)
  - Households: 8,220

Economy
  - Income class: 2nd municipal income class
  - Poverty incidence: 31.64% (2023)
  - Revenue: ₱ 233.4 million (2024)
  - Assets: ₱ 764.2 million (2024)
  - Expenditure: ₱ 236.1 million (2024)
  - Liabilities: ₱ 180.1 million (2024)

Service provider
  - Electricity: Bukidnon 2 Electric Cooperative (BUSECO)
- Time zone: UTC+8 (PST)
- ZIP code: 8723
- PSGC: 1001322000
- IDD : area code: +63 (0)88
- Native languages: Binukid; Cebuano; Ata Manobo; Tagalog
- Website: www.cabanglasanbuk.gov.ph

Cabanglasan, officially the Municipality of Cabanglasan (Binukid and Higaonon: Bánuwa ta Kabanglasán; Cebuano: Lungsod sa Cabanglasan; Tagalog: Bayan ng Cabanglasan), is a municipality in the province of Bukidnon, Philippines. According to the 2024 census, it has a population of 38,365 people.

== History ==
The town was once a Barangay of the capital town, Malaybalay. It was named after a Banglas tree, endemic tree species that inhabit and grow abundantly and distinctively only on this portion of the upper Pulangui. Banglas is hardwood that usually grows in the rocky portion of the Bobunawan riverbanks. Kabanglasan literally means a place that has plenty of Banglas.

Cabanglasan was created as a separate municipality from Malaybalay on August 13, 1979, by virtue of Republic Act 6489.

The movement for the separation of Cabanglasan from his mother municipality (Malaybalay) began in the early 1960s when the people of Pulangi region petitioned for secession. This prompted the passage of House Bill No. 2789 in Congress by the then-Congressman Cesar M. Fortich. The bill was enacted into law without executive approval under Republic Act 6489 but its implementation was delayed due to the declaration of martial law.

Due to the persistence of the residents as spearheaded by Datu Maliwanag (Saturnino P. Linsagan), then President Ferdinand E. Marcos referred the matter to the mother municipality, Malaybalay. A plebiscite was then held wherein the majority voted for the implementation of RA 6489. On August 13, 1979, (by virtue of Batas Pambansa Blg. 17) the first set of municipal officials headed by Mayor Saturnino P. Linsagan aka Datu Maliwanag to his tribesmen, took their oath and held their first session.

== Geography ==
Cabanglasan is geographically located between east longitude 125 degrees 27 minutes and north latitude 8 degrees and 3 minutes. It is located at the eastern part of the province of Bukidnon, bounded in the north and west by the City of Malaybalay and the south by the Municipality of San Fernando, and in the east by the province of Agusan del Sur.

It has a total area of 24,330 hectares (60,100 acres), of which 38% is Alienable and Disposable (A&D) land and 62% is timberland. It has 15 barangays, 5 of which are situated within timberland namely; Freedom, Mandahican, Mauswagon, Jasaan, and Cananga-an. Five barangays, namely; Anlugan, Cabanglasan proper, Iba, Mandaing and Dalacutan are located within A&D land while the remaining 5 barangays as; Cabulohan, Capinonan, Imbatug, Paradise and Mauswagon are located within both timberland and A&D.

It occupies 2.52% of the total provincial area of Bukidnon and 0.74% of the regional area (Northern Mindanao).

=== Slope ===
The major part of the municipality is classified under slope class 8 to 15%. Where such areas are found, it is contiguous to level areas, identified as water retaining areas potentially suited to intensive palay production. Along its North, East and South boundaries are slope class 30% and above, hilly and mountainous are declared as forestal, but not necessarily foliaged. Cabanglasan has an average elevation of 465 meters above sea level.

=== Climate ===
Climate data for Cabanglasan, Bukidnon
Month	Jan	Feb	Mar	Apr	May	Jun	Jul	Aug	Sep	Oct	Nov	Dec	Year
Mean daily maximum °C (°F)	26 (79)	27 (81)	28 (82)	29 (84)	28 (82)	28 (82)	28 (82)	28 (82)	28 (82)	28 (82)	27 (81)	27 (81)	28 (82)
Mean daily minimum °C (°F)	20 (68)	20 (68)	20 (68)	21 (70)	22 (72)	22 (72)	22 (72)	22 (72)	22 (72)	22 (72)	21 (70)	21 (70)	21 (71)
Average precipitation mm (inches)	118 (4.6)	73 (2.9)	66 (2.6)	74 (2.9)	175 (6.9)	261 (10.3)	271 (10.7)	281 (11.1)	267 (10.5)	258 (10.2)	164 (6.5)	93 (3.7)	2,101 (82.9)
Average rainy days	16.0	13.8	12.4	13.1	24.2	27.6	28.9	28.5	27.1	27.4	21.0	16.1	256.1
Source: Meteoblue

Cabanglasan fall under the fourth type. It means that rainfall is more or less evenly distributed throughout the year. May to December is usually the period with long rainfalls. While driest months last from January to April. Mountain climates reasonably form another type of climate. As far as some climatological elements are concerned, except as to temperature, rainfall generally increases with height.

=== Barangays ===
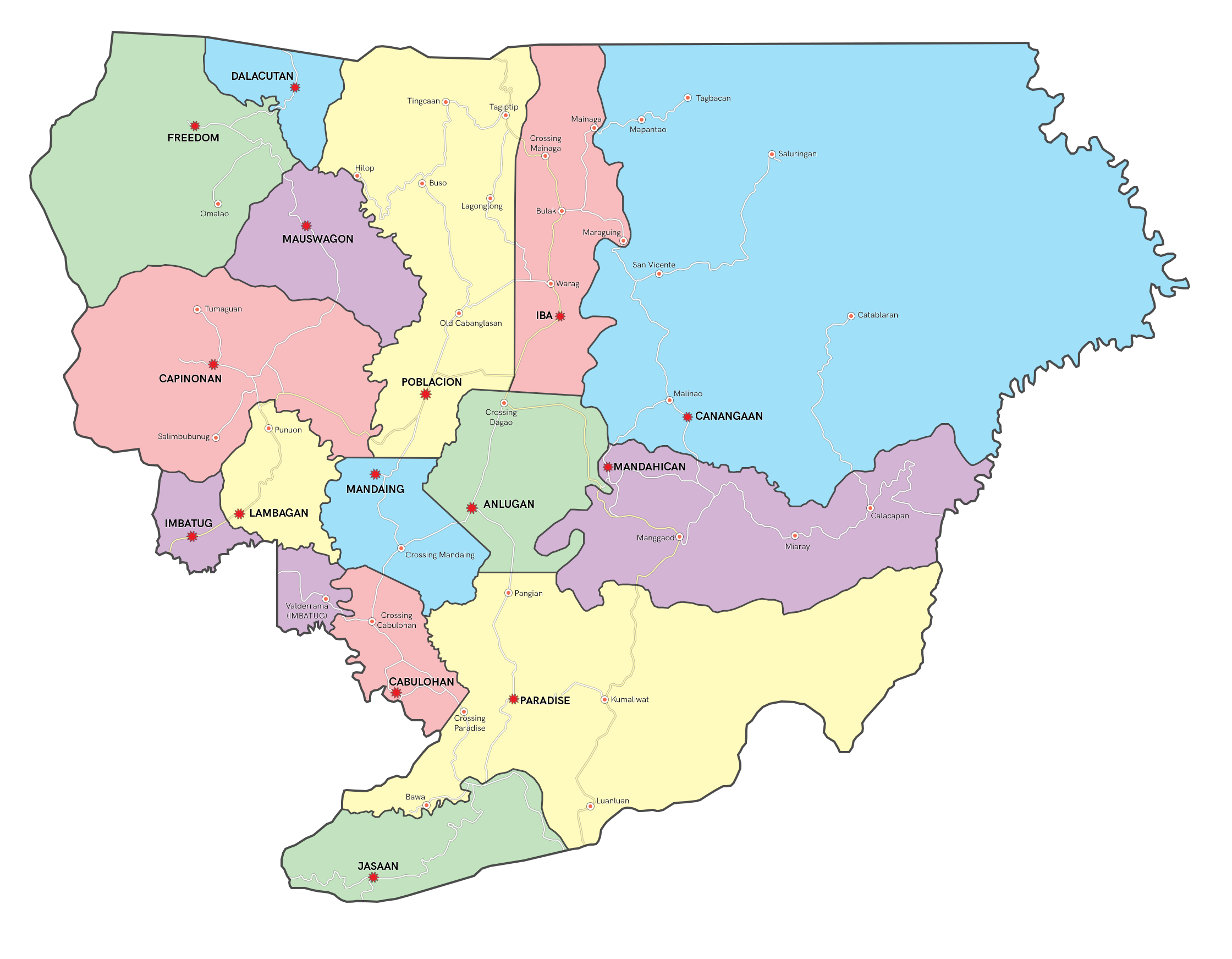
Political map of Cabanglasan.

Cabanglasan is politically subdivided into 15 barangays. Each barangay consists of puroks while some have sitios.

PSGC	Barangay	Population			±% p.a.	
		2024		2010		
101322001	Cabulohan	5.7%	2,179	2,121	▴	0.19%
101322002	Canangaan	7.2%	2,764	2,943	▾	−0.44%
101322003	Iba	10.4%	4,000	3,406	▴	1.12%
101322004	Imbatug	5.9%	2,279	2,265	▴	0.04%
101322005	Lambangan	2.9%	1,112	1,073	▴	0.25%
101322006	Mandaing	4.4%	1,682	1,616	▴	0.28%
101322007	Paradise	6.4%	2,470	2,331	▴	0.40%
101322008	Poblacion	15.5%	5,928	5,710	▴	0.26%
101322009	Anlogan	4.5%	1,715	1,622	▴	0.39%
101322010	Capinonan	7.0%	2,675	2,662	▴	0.03%
101322011	Dalacutan	1.6%	614	559	▴	0.65%
101322012	Freedom	3.9%	1,498	1,714	▾	−0.93%
101322013	Mandahikan	6.5%	2,489	1,840	▴	2.12%
101322014	Mauswagon	3.0%	1,142	1,123	▴	0.12%
101322015	Jasaan	3.8%	1,450	1,442	▴	0.04%
	Total		38,365	32,427	▴	1.18%

== Demographics ==
Population census of Cabanglasan
Year	Pop.	±% p.a.
1980	16,843	—
1990	26,351	+4.58%
1995	29,288	+2.00%
2000	32,305	+2.12%
2007	32,817	+0.22%
2010	32,427	−0.43%
2015	33,997	+0.90%
2020	36,286	+1.38%
2024	38,365	+1.35%
Source: Philippine Statistics Authority

In the 2020 census, the population of Cabanglasan was 36,286 people, with a density of 150 inhabitants per square kilometre or 390 inhabitants per square mile.

Cabanglasan was created to become a municipality on August 13, 1979, by virtue of Republic Act 6489. In the following year, 1980, a regular census on population and housing was conducted nationwide, wherein Cabanglasan had an actual population count of 16,843.

In 1990, there was another census of population and housing. Because of the presence of the two logging companies, the T.H. Valderrama and Talakag Timber Incorporated, the population of this town grew to 26,351, an increase of about 9,508 or 56.45%. During those Censal years Barangays Cabulohan, Capinonan and Imbatug had a greater population because it was where the logging companies established their plant and housing camps.

In 1995, a mid-decade census on population and housing was made. During that year, Cabanglasan had a population of 29,288 or an increase of 11.15%. However, due to the closure of the two logging companies in 1991, the population of the three barangays mentioned above decreased while the population of other barangays increased. Barangay Poblacion had an increase of 68.2116%. In 1990, its population was only 2,287 but it grew to 3,847 in 1995. This increase was due to the influx of former workers from the logging companies who settled in the neighbouring barangays. As a result, the overall population count of the municipality increased at an average growth rate of 2.50%.

Another factor in the population increase is the ongoing development of the municipality, including road accessibility to the different barangays and sitios, farm modernization, electrification and the coming of small and medium investors to establish their business in the Poblacion.

== Economy ==
Poverty incidence of Cabanglasan (%)

Source: Philippine Statistics Authority

== Infrastructure ==
=== Transportation ===
Being typically landlocked, the means of transportation for intra-municipal travel is through jeepneys and motorcycles, buses and jeepneys can be availed of for travels going out of the municipality.

Most of the vehicles (82%) are privately owned. About 16% are public utility vehicles while only 2% belonged to the government.

The whole stretch of the national highway (21.61 km) is still gravel-paved. Of the 15.065 km of municipal road, 4% has already been converted to concrete pavement, 9% is gravel-paved, and the rest is still earth-paved. The aggregate length of barangay roads in the municipality has been recorded at 287.409 km. Nearly 41% (117.603) of this is gravel-paved, a little over half (56%) of the total length is still unpaved while only less than 1% has been concreted. It can also be noted that earth-paved roads – especially roads going to the interior sitios are not passable during the rainy season.

Bridges link gaps between rivers. For areas which are not regular routes of land transportation but are bounded by rivers, hanging footbridges were constructed.

=== Communication ===
Postal services of the municipality are being provided by the Bureau of Post which is staffed by a Postmaster. Being understaffed, the postmaster also served as the municipality's letter carrier.

For telecommunication, the provincial government had installed a single-sideband radio in the municipality. This is actually part of the Provincial Radio Communication Network. Through this system, the municipality is able to reach out to other parts of the province directly or via relay stations. This is being complemented by handheld radios in some barangays which the municipality used for transmitting messages to these areas. Cabanglasan's populace is also kept abreast of recent information which is of regional and/or national significance through two Television channels which signal covered the municipality. These are the ABS-CBN (Channel 2) and GMA (Channel 12). AM and FM Band radio Stations from Malaybalay, Valencia, Cagayan and Davao also reached the municipality. Print media on the other hand only include a local newspaper (Bukidnon Newswatch) which has a weekly circulation.

=== Water systems ===
Springs, rivers and deep wells are the sources of water supply used for both domestic water supply and irrigation needs. Deep wells and springs are commonly used as potable water supply. Local government, congressional initiatives, and regional and senatorial funds are used to develop these sources. The municipal government's ardent thrust to provide basic services to its constituents can be well manifested by its current pursuit to develop a level III type of water system through funding from the World Bank. The municipal government had entered into a loan agreement with the bank to develop a system that will provide for an individual pipe connection for each household within the barangays of Poblacion and Iba. Data shows that Level I and Level II types of systems are the most prevalent type of water supply in the municipality. Level I water system is currently serving 7.17% of the total households. Likewise, Level II is providing water for 47.39% of all households, while Level III only served 3.62% of the total. The rest (41.82%) still remained un-served by a water supply system

=== Health services ===
The health service in the Municipality of Cabanglasan is catered by the Municipal Health Office (MHO) and one private lying-in clinic. The former handles the public health services and some clinical services while the latter serves most of the clinical cases. The MHO is located at Poblacion and the nine Barangay Health Stations are located in the different barangays. These serve as channels for providing basic health services to the general populace. The office is staffed by one medical doctor, one dentist, one DOH-nurse, four permanent Rural Health Midwives (RHMs), five Job Order RHMs, one Rural Sanitary Inspector (RSI), and one dental aid. The health personnel is augmented by 175 Barangay Health Workers (BHW) 38 “hilots” and other health-oriented NGOs such as BIDANI, MAP, and the German Rolling Clinic.

Health statistics showed that the four leading causes of morbidity fall under communicable diseases which are preventable in nature but there was a gradual increase in such cases in the past few years. This increase could be attributed to the lack of permanent personnel assigned in far-flung and strategically located barangays. Another contributing factor is the inadequate supply of medicines and medical logistics which are necessary for the implementation of health services and programs. Records from the nutrition program of the municipality revealed the high prevalence rate of malnutrition has gradually decreased. This accomplishment was due to the full support of the Local Government Unit and Department of Health, and the increased awareness of the general populace on proper nutrition.

=== Security ===
The total population is 29,288 as of 1995 having a ratio of one policeman per 1,220 inhabitants. The national standard ratio is one policeman per one thousand inhabitants. Therefore, the Cabanglasan police force needs 15 Policemen to meet the standard ratio.

Special Force (SF) of the Philippine Army (PA) established four strategic detachments, located at Barangay Poblacion, Freedom, Cananga-an and Jasaan. Each detachment is staffed by two regular elements of the SF-PA assisted by their respective CAFGUs (Citizen Armed Forces Geographical Units). Cabanglasan police force is headed by one Police Commission Officer (PCO) as Chief of Police (COP), twenty-three Police Non-Commission Officer (PCNOs) with five police community precincts. Each PCP is headed by one policeman assisted by their respective Bantay Bayan/CVOs (Civilian Volunteers Organization). The area of responsibility or coverage has one PCP for every three Barangays.

== Education ==
=== Elementary ===
There are 26 elementary schools within the municipality three schools are within the urban centre, while the remaining 23 schools are distributed throughout the rural areas. Each barangay has at least one elementary school with Iba and Poblacion having the biggest area in terms of hectares. All schools have playgrounds, and some have clinics but none of them has a laboratory, shop or library.

=== Secondary ===
The Municipality of Cabanglasan has five secondary schools, three public schools and two private school, namely: Cabulohan-Paradise National High School, Cabanglasan National High School, Capinonan National High School, Fr. Leoni Memorial School and Promise Mountain Christian Academy.

=== Tertiary ===
The municipality has an external campus for Bukidnon State University situated in Barangay Iba.
