= Tagoloan River =

- Tagoloan River mouth Tagoloan River (Philippines)

Location
- Country: Philippines
- Region: Northern Mindanao
- Province: Bukidnon; Misamis Oriental

Physical characteristics
- Source
  - location: Malaybalay City, Bukidnon
  - elevation: 2,041 ft (622 m)
- Mouth: Macajalar Bay
  - location: Tagoloan, Misamis Oriental
  - coordinates: 8°33′20″N 124°44′37″E
  - elevation: 0 m (0 ft)
- Length: 106 km (66 mi)
- Basin size: 1,704 km^{2} (658 sq mi)
- Discharge
  - location: Macajalar Bay

Basin features
- Tributaries
  - left: Dila River; Alalum River; Mangima River
  - right: Amusig River; Siloo River; Malitbog River

The Tagoloan River is the 13th largest river system in the Philippines in terms of watershed size, as classified by the National Water Resources Board. It has an estimated drainage area of 1,704 square kilometres (658 sq mi) covering the provinces of Bukidnon and Misamis Oriental. It has a length of 106 kilometres (66 mi) from its source in Malaybalay City in Bukidnon province.
