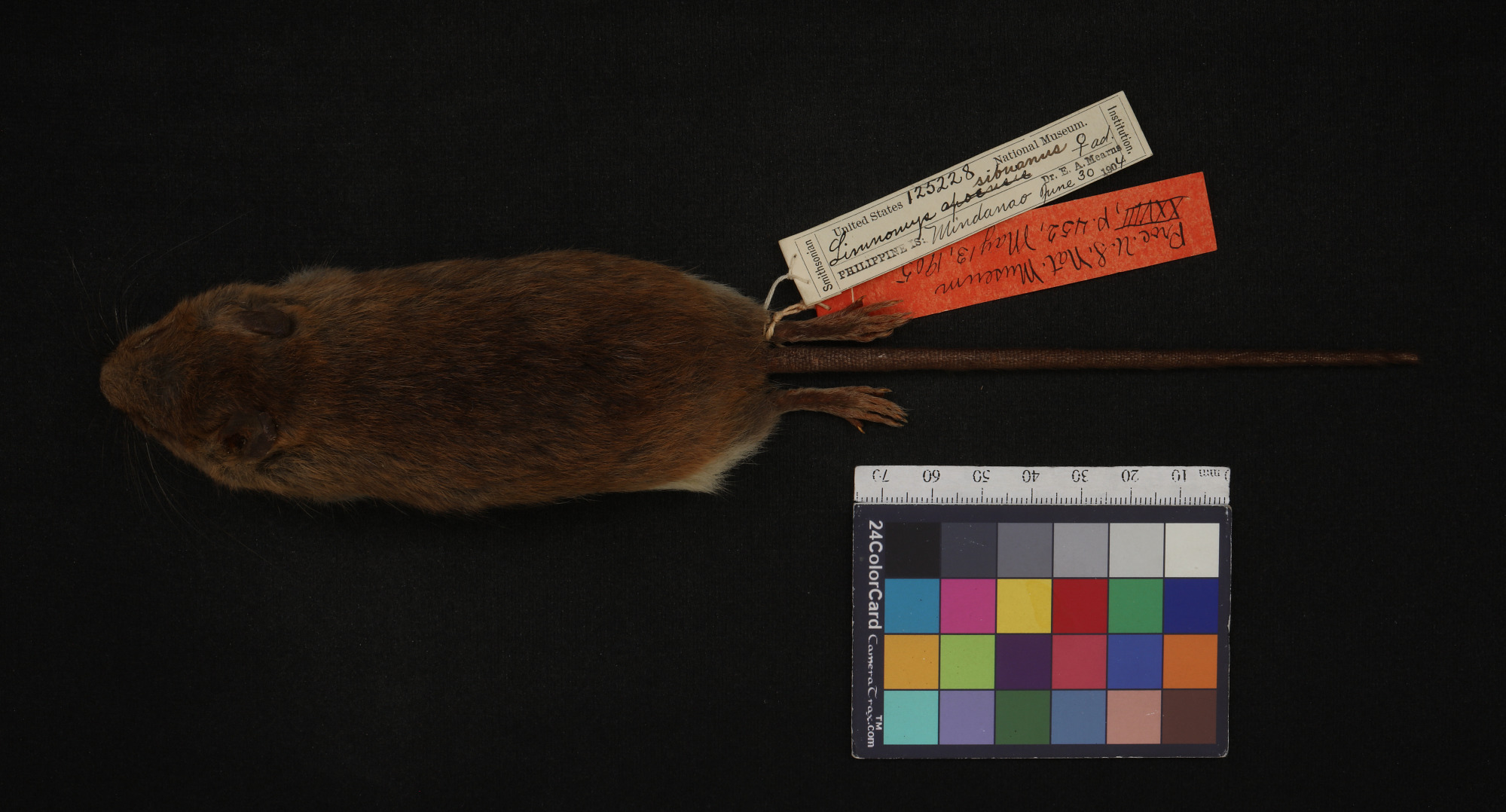

Conservation status
- Least Concern (IUCN 3.1)

Scientific classification
- Kingdom: Animalia
- Phylum: Chordata
- Class: Mammalia
- Order: Rodentia
- Family: Muridae
- Genus: Limnomys
- Species: L. sibuanus

Binomial name
- Limnomys sibuanus Mearns, 1905
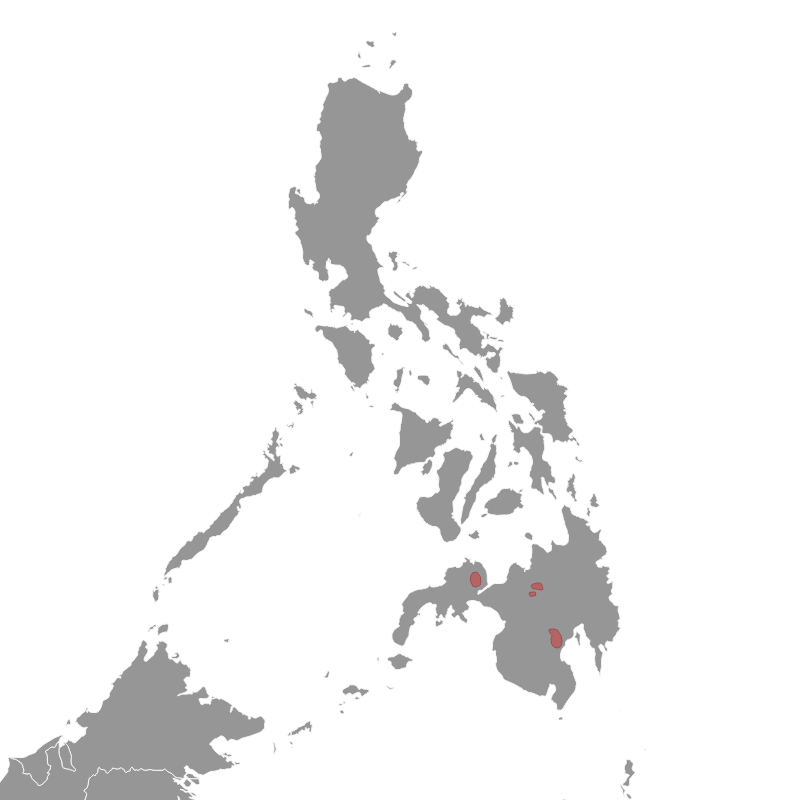

= Mindanao mountain rat =

Species of rodent

The Mindanao mountain rat or long-tailed moss mouse (Limnomys sibuanus), is a species of rodent in the family Muridae. It is found only in the Philippines, where it is present at high altitudes in the Kitanglad Mountain Range on the island of Mindanao.

== Taxonomy ==
Limnomys sibuanus was first described in 1905 by the American naturalist Edgar Alexander Mearns. It was based on a single individual and limited in its scope. In 1913, the biologist Ned Hollister described a second species in the genus, L. mearnsii, from a number of specimens, but this was later synonymised with L. sibuanus. Another species was described in 2003 by Eric A. Rickart as Limnomys bryophilus. The new species had a "relatively longer tail, larger hind feet, softer pelage with grayish-white ventral coloration, larger skull with a longer rostrum, larger auditory bullae, larger molars, and other [distinguishing] cranial and dental features." Both species are endemic to the Kitanglad Mountain Range in central Mindanao in the Philippines, but they differ in the elevations at which they are found.

== Description ==
The Mindanao mountain rat has a head-and-body length of 119 to 144 mm (4.69 to 5.67 in) and a tail length of 147 to 174 mm (5.79 to 6.85 in), and weighs 47 to 82 grams (1.66 to 2.89 oz). The fur is short and somewhat coarse with flattened awns. The upper parts of this rat are yellowish-brown and the underparts are plain white, with no brown on the chest. The pinnae and the hind feet are smaller than those of L. bryophilus. Its karyotype has 2n = 42 and FN = 61/62.

== Distribution and habitat ==
The species is native to the Kitanglad Mountain Range in Mindanao where it occurs on Mount Apo, Mount Kitanglad and Mount Malindang. It is found at altitudes of between 2,000 and 2,800 m (6,600 and 9,200 ft). Its habitat is forests composed mostly of conifers and laurels up to 10 m (33 ft) high, with fallen trees, rhododendrons, other shrubs, ferns, orchids, mosses and lichens.

== Status ==
L. sibuanus has a limited range but it is a common species in the tropical high altitude rainforest and moss forest; the whole mountain range is included in the Mount Kitanglad Range Natural Park, which was designated a protected area in 2000. The habitat is not being exploited and no particular threats to this species are known, so the International Union for Conservation of Nature has assessed its conservation status as being of "least concern".
