= Gray-bellied mountain rat =

Conservation status
- Least Concern (IUCN 3.1)

Scientific classification
- Kingdom: Animalia
- Phylum: Chordata
- Class: Mammalia
- Order: Rodentia
- Family: Muridae
- Genus: Limnomys
- Species: L. bryophilus

Binomial name
- Limnomys bryophilus Rickart, Heaney & Tabaranza Jr., 2003
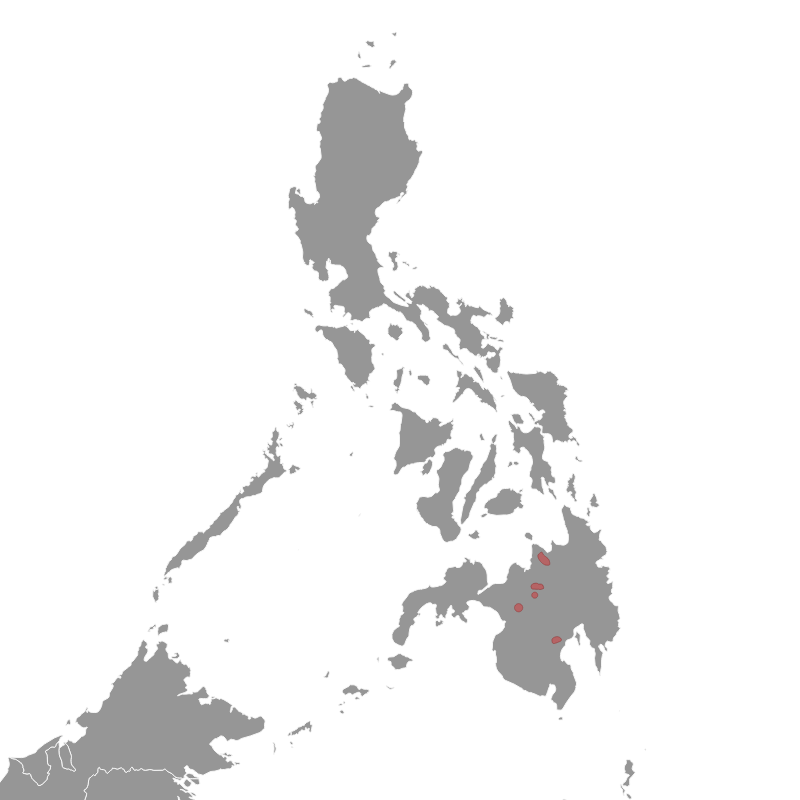

Species of rodent

The gray-bellied mountain rat, also known as the gray-bellied limnomys and the buffy-collared moss-mouse (Limnomys bryophilus), is a species of rodent in the family Muridae.

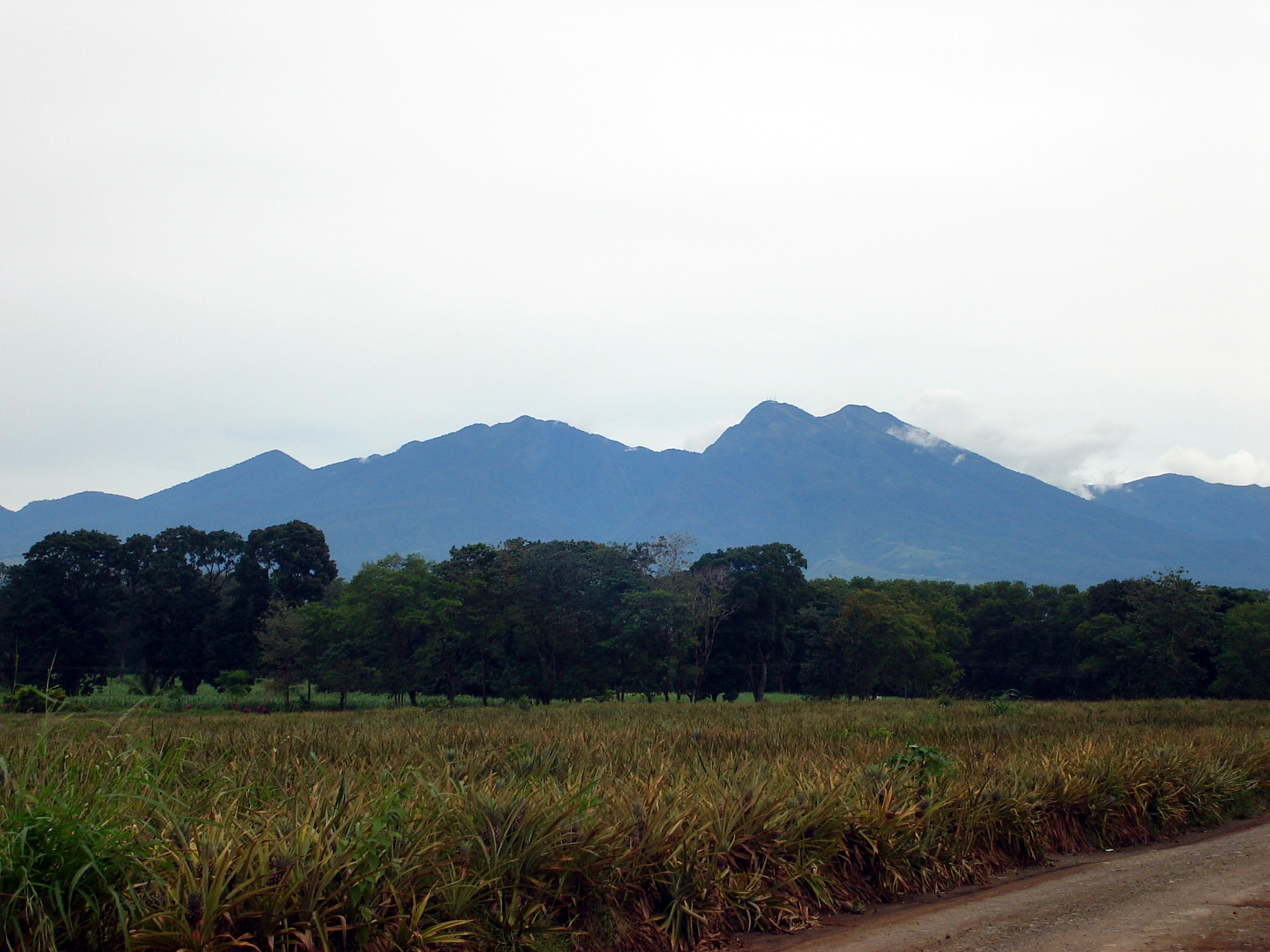
The heart of the Kitanglad range, habitat of Limnomys bryophilus

It is found only in the Philippines, where it is common at high elevations of the Kitanglad Mountain Range in the province of Bukidnon on the island of Mindanao. Its habitat is the moss-rich montane cloud forest from about 2,250 metres up to about 2,800 metres.

The rats, which are nocturnal, feed on the ground on arthropods, earthworms, fruit, and seeds. Although equipped with three pairs of mammae, females have been observed to give birth about once a year to only a small number of young, commonly as few as one or two.

The gray-bellied mountain rat is one of only two species in the genus Limnomys. The other, and the rat's only close relation, is the Mindanao mountain rat, Limnomys sibuanus. While gray-bellies have been recorded only in the Kitanglad Mountains, the Mindanao is considered to be endemic to the mountains of the island of Mindanao and has been recorded from Mount Apo and Mount Malindang as well as from Mount Kitanglad. It has also been observed at lower elevations, its range being between about 2,000 metres and about 2,800 metres.

The alternative name of "buffy-collared moss-mouse" reflects the rat's small size.
