= Mount Kitanglad =

Inactive volcano in Bukidnon, Philippines

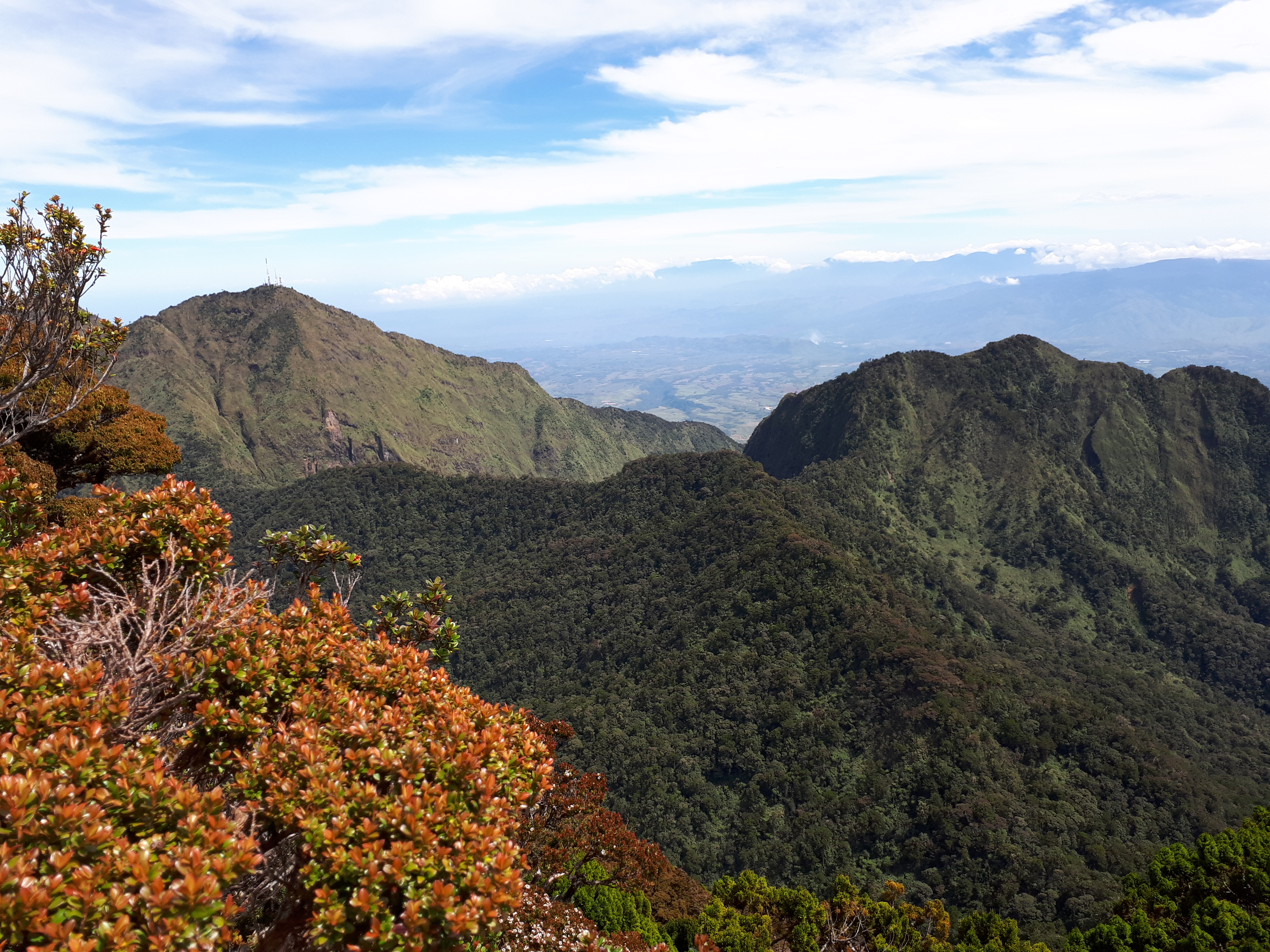
- Mt. Kitanglad (left) as seen from Mount Dulang-dulang

Highest point
- Elevation: 2,899 m (9,511 ft) (Note: Elevation information varies between sources. Several sources evaluated as very reliable for this information give the elevation of Mount Kitanglad as 2,899 m. Several sources evaluated as less reliable for this information list a mountain named "Mount Katanglad" (spelled with "Ka" instead of "Ki") with an elevation of 2,938 m. Information gathered from the more reliable sources mentioned previously suggests that the elevation information in these sources is in error for Mount Kitanglad, and may refer to the nearby peak of Mount Dulang-dulang. Since the discovery of this error, Peakbagger (a site previously in error over the confusion between the two peaks) now has a verified page for "Mount Dulang-dulang", confirming the above information for that peak. Additionally, Peakbagger now also has a page for "Mt. Kitanglad" (with the correct spelling with an "i" and the corrected elevation data) explaining the mistake, though the Kitanglad page does contain a disclaimer stating its information is currently unverified.)
- Prominence: 350 m (1,150 ft)
- Listing: Philippines highest peaks 4th
- Coordinates: 8°8′34″N 124°54′45″E

Geography
- Location within Mindanao mainland Location within Philippines
- Country: Philippines
- Province: Bukidnon
- Region: Northern Mindanao
- Parent range: Kitanglad Mountain Range

Climbing
- Easiest route: Intavas, La Fortuna, Impasug-ong, Bukidnon

Mount Kitanglad is an inactive volcano located in the Kitanglad Mountain Range in Bukidnon province on Mindanao island. It is the fourth highest mountain in the Philippines and has an approximate height of 2,899 metres (9,511 ft). It is located between Malaybalay and the municipalities of Lantapan, Impasugong, Sumilao and Libona. It is home to one of the Philippines' few remaining rainforests. It is part of the ancestral domain of the Higaonon, the Talaandig, and the Bukidnon people.

Due to its high elevation, several communications and broadcasting companies constructed relay stations at the summit.

== Etymology and folklore ==
Mount Kitanglad is part of the ancestral lands of three Lumad groups: the Higaonon, the Talaandig, and the Bukidnon people. In their common oral legend of Olaging, there was once a great flood that submerged the area leaving only the tips of the mountains visible (a story shared by neighboring Mount Kalatungan). During the flood, the visible portion of Mount Kitanglad resembled a patch of tanglad (lemongrass), an important medicinal plant, and was thus named "Kitanglad" (also spelled "Katanglad") by the legendary datu Agbibilin.

Agbibilin is said to have four sons, each of the sons were the ancestors of the modern-day Manobo; the Maranao; the Maguindanao; and finally the three groups native to Kitanglad: the Higaonon, Talaandig, and Bukidnon. The four brothers and their tribes were constantly at war with each other over territory, until Agbibilin commanded them to settle their dispute by delineating their territories. They met at a house in Barabyas, Tikalaan (in Talakag, southwest of Kitanglad) and performed the peace pact ritual (Tampuda ho Balagon). In the pact, the brothers marked territories to prevent further war, using rivers and peaks of mountain ranges (tagaytay). Mount Kitanglad as well as northern Bukidnon and Misamis Oriental went to the Higaonon-Talaandig-Bukidnon group.

According to the Mines and Geosciences Bureau Lands Geological Survey Division, Mount Kitanglad was also known to the Spanish as Mount Alanguilan, from an 1850 Spanish military sketch of a Moro encampment in the summit overlooking the "Rio de Cumaycay" (which is the Kumaykay River in Dahilayan, Manolo Fortich) during the Spanish-Moro Wars. The name is from Tagalog alangilan, referring to the ylang-ylang tree (Cananga odorata).

== Conservation ==
Mount Kitanglad was proclaimed a protected area under the natural park category through Presidential Proclamation 896 dated October 24, 1996. On November 9, 2000, Mount Kitanglad finally became a full-fledged protected area when Congress approved Republic Act 8978 also known as the "Mt. Kitanglad Range Protected Area Act of 2000."

Mount Kitanglad hosts over 600 rare and endemic species, including the Philippine tarsier and the Rafflesia schadenbergiana, the world's second largest flower. It is a nesting place for the critically endangered Philippine eagle. Other endemic species that are found here are the pygmy fruit bat Alionycteris paucidentata and two native mice, Katanglad shrew-mouse and Gray-bellied mountain rat.

In 2009, Mount Kitanglad Range Natural Park (MKRNP) was declared as an ASEAN Heritage Park.

== Ancestral domain ==
Mount Kitanglad is part of the ancestral domain of three major Indigenous groups: the Talaandig, Higaonon, and Bukidnon peoples. Indigenous communities are working to have Mount Kitanglad recognized as Indigenous peoples' and community conserved territories and areas to enforce Indigenous customary rules on the mountain range.

== See also ==
- Mount Kalatungan
- List of Southeast Asian mountains
- List of inactive volcanoes in the Philippines
