= Mount Dulang-dulang =

Highest peak of the Kitanglad Mountain Range

- Mount D2; Mount Katanglad
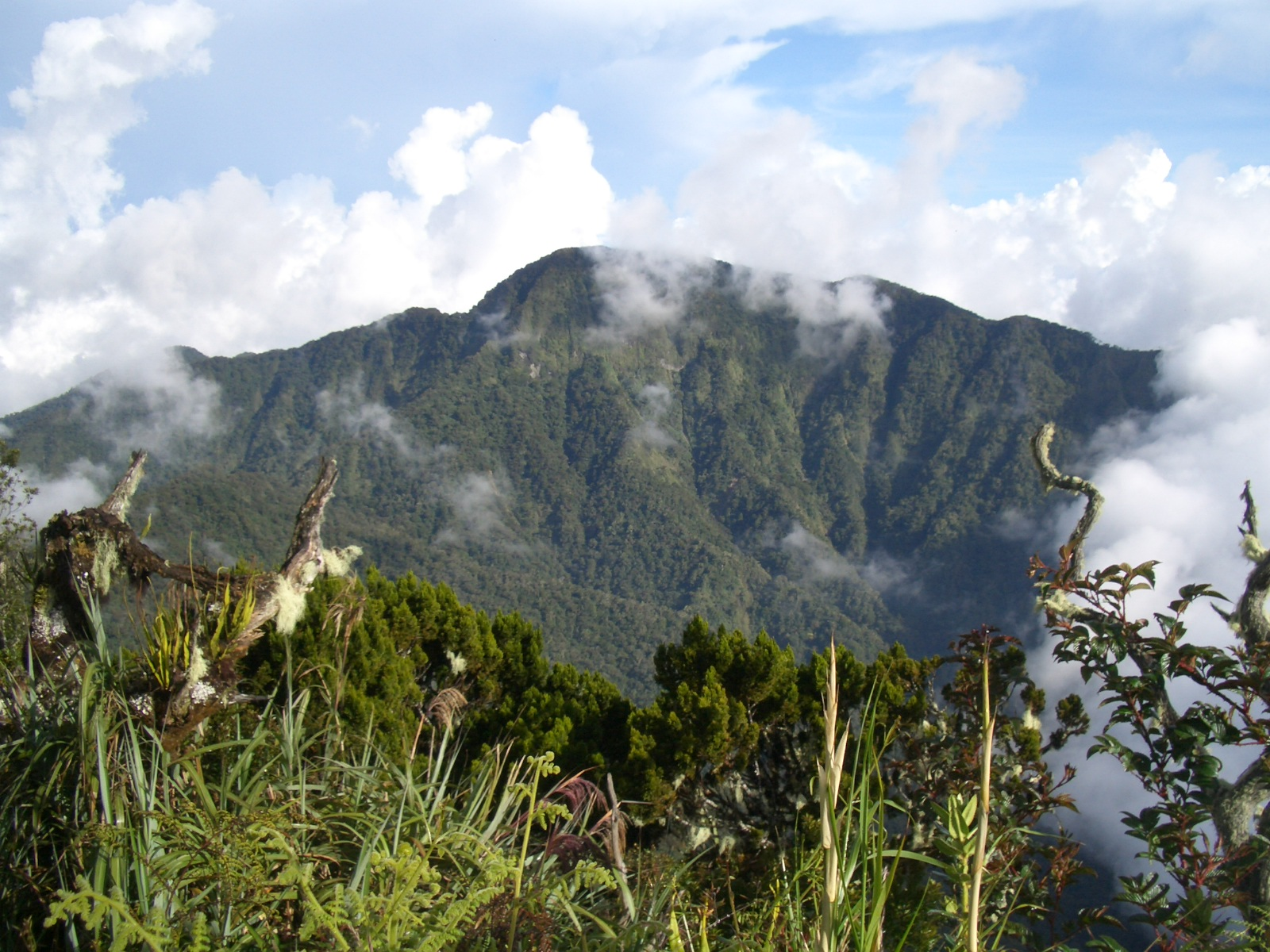
- Mount Dulang-dulang viewed from the peak of Mount Kitanglad

Highest point
- Elevation: 2,941 m (9,649 ft) (Note: Several sources state elevation, prominence and country rank information of another peak matching the data of Mount Dulang-dulang. These sources list a mountain named "Mount Katanglad" (spelled with "Ka" instead of the "Ki" in the usual spelling of Mount Kitanglad) with an elevation of 2,941 m and a prominence of 2,440 m. Several other sources evaluated as very reliable for this information give the elevation of Mount Kitanglad (with an "i") as 2,899 m. Information gathered from these sources suggests that the elevation and prominence information of Peaklist and Peakbagger is in error for Mount Katanglad (with an "a"), and likely refer to nearby Dulang-dulang. Since the discovery of this error, Peakbagger (a site previously in error over the confusion between the two peaks) now has a verified page for "Mount Dulang-dulang", confirming the above information for the peak. Additionally, Peakbagger now also has a page for "Mt. Kitanglad" (with the correct spelling with an "i" and the corrected elevation data) explaining the mistake, though the Kitanglad page does contain a disclaimer stating its information is currently unverified.)
- Prominence: 2,444 m (8,018 ft)
- Listing: Philippines highest peaks 2nd; Philippines ultra peaks 6th; Ribu; Northern Mindanao highest point; Ultra
- Coordinates: 08°06′55″N 124°55′15″E

Geography
- Location within Mindanao mainland Location within Philippines
- Country: Philippines
- Region: Northern Mindanao
- Province: Bukidnon
- Parent range: Kitanglad Mountain Range

Climbing
- Easiest route: Bol-ogan Trail, Sitio Bol-ogan, Barangay Songco, Lantapan, Bukidnon

Mount Dulang-dulang, dubbed by Filipino mountaineers as "D2" and also known as Mount Katanglad, is the highest elevation peak in the Kitanglad Mountain Range, located in the north central portion of the province of Bukidnon in the island of Mindanao. It is the second highest mountain of the Philippines at 2,941 metres (9,649 ft) above sea level, second only to Mount Apo of Davao at 2,956 m (9,698 ft) and slightly higher than Mount Pulag of Luzon, the third highest at 2,928 m (9,606 ft).

The mountain is regarded by the Talaandig tribe of Lantapan as a sacred place. The mountain range is the ancestral domain of the Bukidnon, Higaonon, and Talaandig Indigenous peoples.

== Geography and biodiversity ==
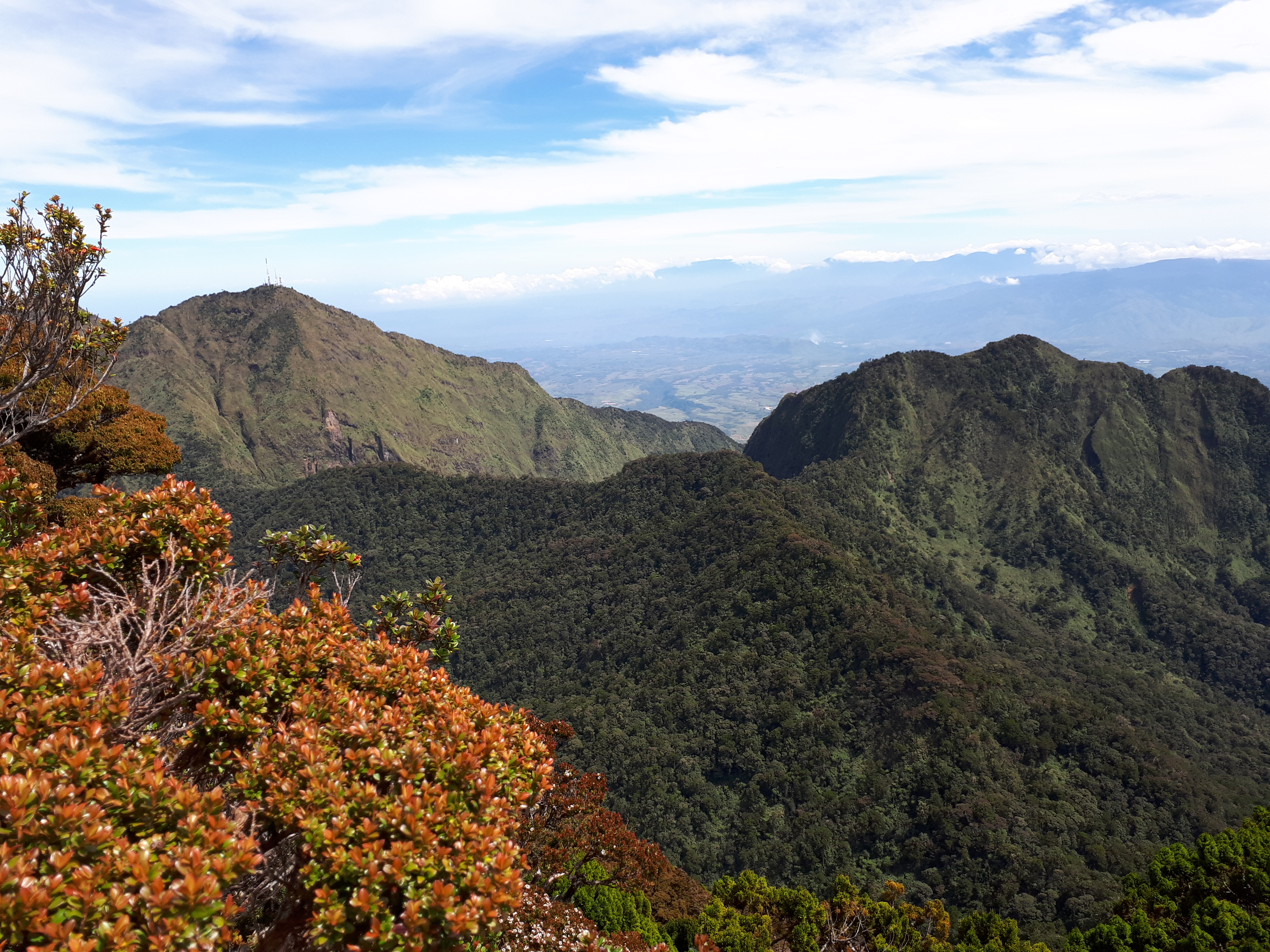
View from Mount Dulang-dulang summit

Mount Dulang-dulang, similar to other peaks located in the Kitanglad Mountain Range, is covered by lofty forests and is a home to a variety of fauna and flora. It is home to 58 mammal species, including bats, squirrels, monkeys, wild boars, flying lemurs, shrews, and deer.

The Philippine eagle is also sighted within the vicinity of the mountain. At least 58 families and 185 species of trees and other woody vegetation species are found within Mount Kitanglad Range Natural Park.

== Hydrological features ==
Mount Dulang-dulang, including the Kitanglad Mountain Range, is the headwater catchment area of several major river systems which include the Maagnao River and Alanib River, tributaries of the Pulangi River, which drains into the Rio Grande de Mindanao in Cotabato City.

The Sawaga River is the main water source of the Bukidnon people for their homes and agriculture.

== See also ==
- List of volcanoes in the Philippines
- List of Southeast Asian mountains
