= Limnomys =

Scientific classification
- Domain: Eukaryota
- Kingdom: Animalia
- Phylum: Chordata
- Class: Mammalia
- Order: Rodentia
- Family: Muridae
- Tribe: Rattini
- Genus: Limnomys; Mearns, 1905

Type species
- Limnomys sibuanus

Species
- Limnomys bryophilus Limnomys sibuanus

Genus of rodents

Limnomys is a genus of rodent in the family Muridae endemic to Mindanao, Philippines. It contains the following species:

- Gray-bellied mountain rat (Limnomys bryophilus)
- Mindanao mountain rat (Limnomys sibuanus)
