= Manolo Fortich =

Municipality in Bukidnon, Philippines

Manolo Fortich Maluko
- Municipality
- Municipality of Manolo Fortich
- Manolo Fortich Centennial Plaza

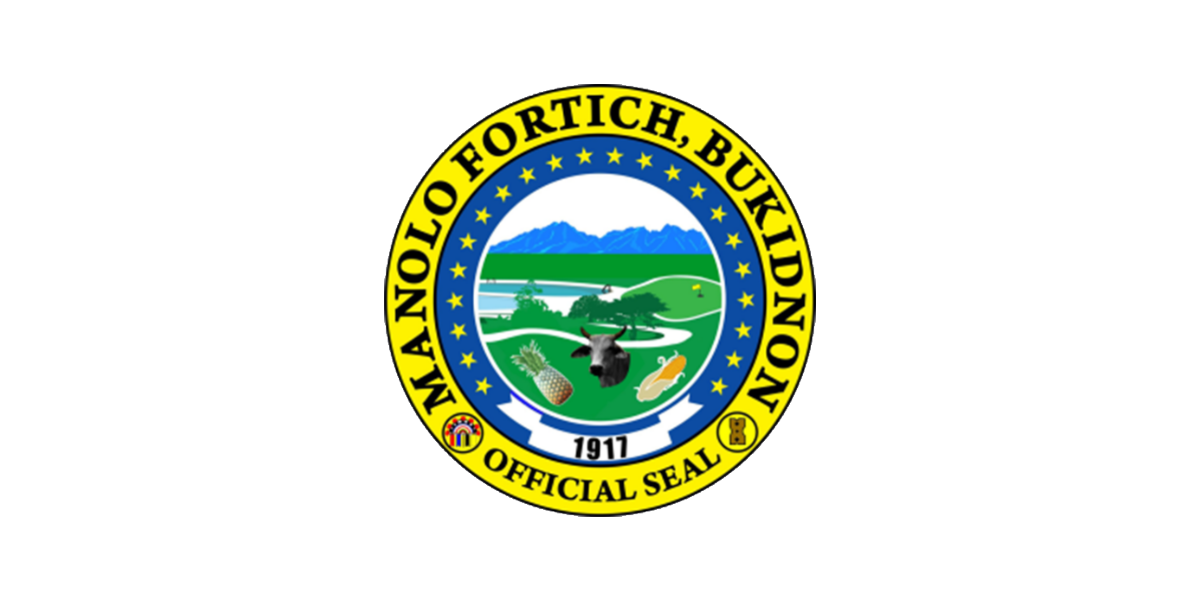
- Flag Seal
- Nickname: Adventure Capital of Bukidnon
- Motto: "Lupad Manolo Fortich"
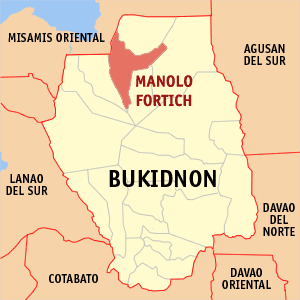
- Map of Bukidnon with Manolo Fortich highlighted
- Interactive map of Manolo Fortich
- Location within the Philippines
- Coordinates: 8°22′03″N 124°51′56″E
- Country: Philippines
- Region: Northern Mindanao
- Province: Bukidnon
- District: 1st district
- Founded: April 4, 1946
- Named for: Mayor Manolo Fortich
- Barangays: 22 (see Barangays)

Government
  - Type: Sangguniang Bayan
  - Mayor: Rogelio N. Quiño
  - Vice Mayor: Reynaldo L. Bagayas Jr.
  - Representative: Jose Manuel F. Alba
  - Municipal Council: Members: Miguel D. Demata; Jay S. Albarece; Rina E. Quiño; Elziver A. Dagunlay; Joy L. Cordovez; Christy Leparto-Salabe; Raquel Abales-Bayacag; Junidini J. Artajo
  - Electorate: 67,460 voters (2025)

Area
  - Total: 413.60 km^{2} (159.69 sq mi)
- Elevation: 504 m (1,654 ft)
- Highest elevation: 664 m (2,178 ft)
- Lowest elevation: 170 m (560 ft)

Population (2024 census)
  - Total: 118,075
  - Density: 285.48/km^{2} (739.39/sq mi)
  - Households: 26,196

Economy
  - Income class: 1st municipal income class
  - Poverty incidence: 21.79% (2023)
  - Revenue: ₱ 736.9 million (2024)
  - Assets: ₱ 2,230 million (2024)
  - Expenditure: ₱ 680.9 million (2024)
  - Liabilities: ₱ 666.5 million (2024)

Service provider
  - Electricity: Bukidnon 2 Electric Cooperative (BUSECO)
- Time zone: UTC+8 (PST)
- ZIP code: 8703
- PSGC: 1001314000
- IDD : area code: +63 (0)88
- Native languages: Binukid; Cebuano; Ata Manobo; Tagalog
- Website: web.manolofortich.gov.ph

Manolo Fortich, officially the Municipality of Manolo Fortich (Bukid and Higaonon: Banuwa ta Manolo Fortich; Cebuano: Lungsod sa Manolo Fortich; Tagalog: Bayan ng Manolo Fortich), is a municipality in the province of Bukidnon, Philippines. According to the 2024 census, it has a population of 118,075 people.

Manolo Fortich used to be known as Maluko; it was renamed in 1957. Maluko also happens to be the name of one of the municipality's barangay.

Manolo Fortich is the venue of the Banog-Banog Festival, held annually in the month of March.

== History ==
Before the coming of the Spaniards, the term "Bukidnon" referred to as the semi-sedentary Indigenous inhabitants of the high plateaus and rugged mountain ranges of central Mindanao. The more prominent of these peoples were the Manobo people who were the earliest settlers of this region. Located on the northern part of Bukidnon, is the Municipality of Manolo Fortich.

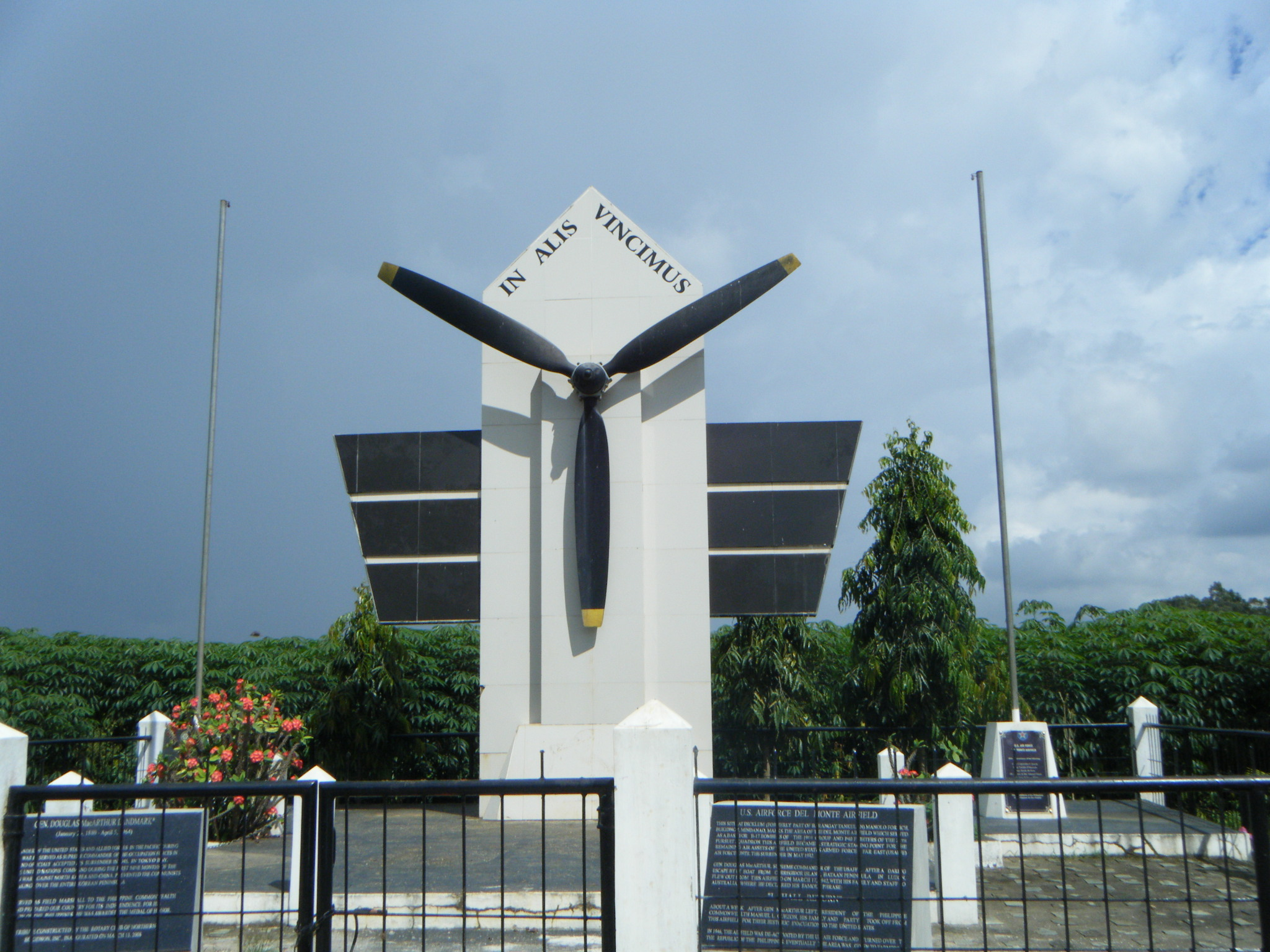
The MacArthur Monument in Barangay Diclum, the site of the World War II Del Monte Airfield from which Douglas MacArthur was evacuated to Australia from the Philippines after the fall of Corregidor and Bataan

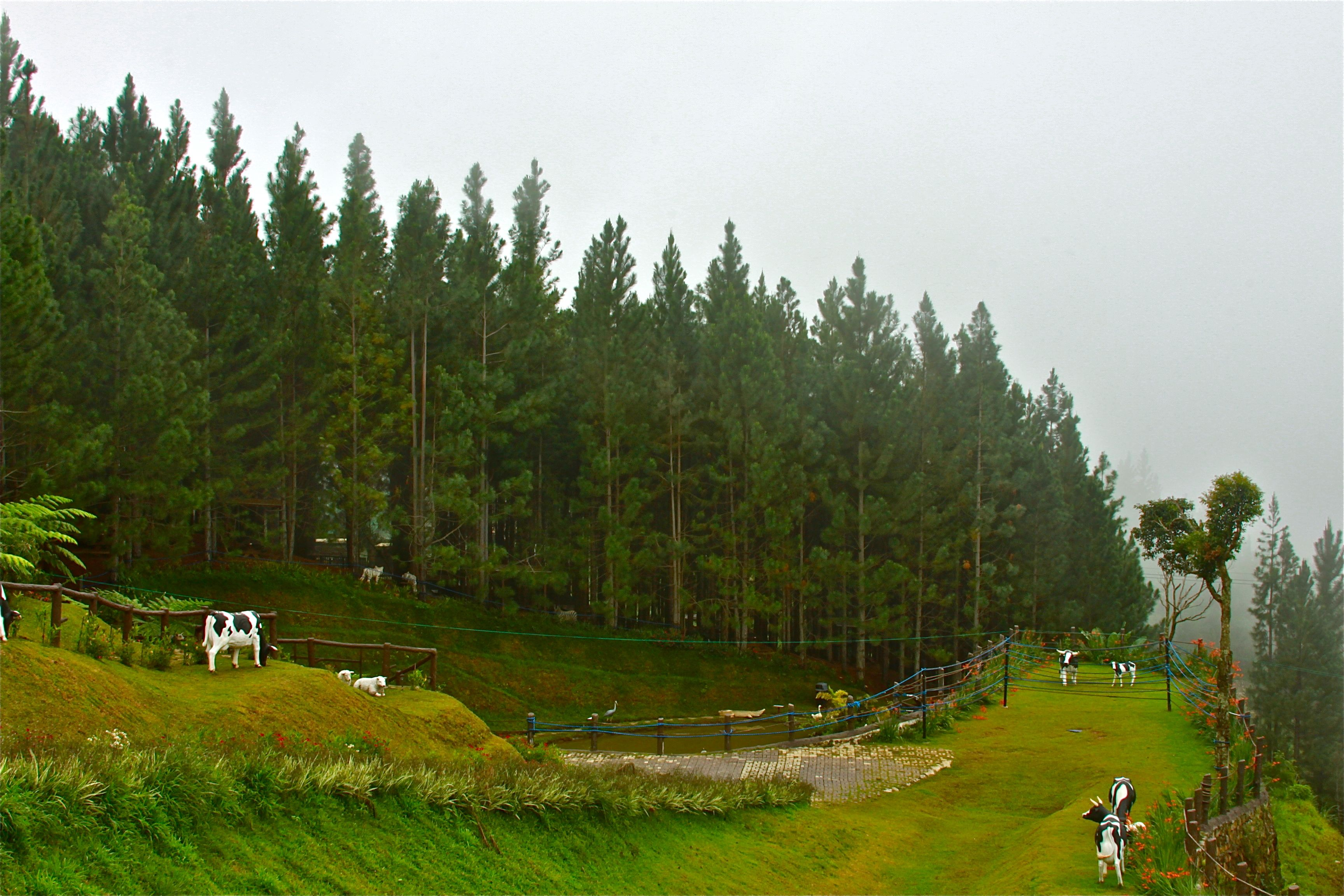
The Forest Camp in barangay Dahilayan

The great pre-historic Asiatic migration was believed to have brought the early settlers of Bukidnon. It was theorized that they came from places of what is now known as Indonesia. Traveling by the sea, these migrants reached the gulf of Davao where some ventured further to areas of what is now known as Bukidnon and Misamis Oriental. The Asiatic beginnings of these people can be seen from their oral tradition and folktales, like the "Kalikat Hu Mga Elaw Dini Ta Mindanao" (Origin of the People of Mindanao). This folktale revolved on the story of two brothers from Asia "who crossed the seas" in their long journey "towards the east" which refers to the islands of the Philippines. The brothers reportedly landed in the island of Mindanao. With the region experiencing a drought, one of the brothers was forced to venture Northward in order to survive. He did this by following a dried up river to its almost dried up source, a lake. He settled and inter-married with the local inhabitants in the upstream of what is now known as Pulangi River. He and his family were considered as the ancestors of the present Bukidnons.

During the pre-historic era, the Bukidnons, also called Monteses or mountain-people, had settled in the area of what is now the Province of Bukidnon. These people have remained traditional till 1860 preserving most of their customs and traditions. Furthermore, these people had not been significantly influenced by the Spanish colonizers because of their isolation. The rugged mountain ranges and high plateaus which serve as home to these people presented an overwhelming obstacle to these colonizers. The Bukidnons undoubtedly have links to the culture predominant in the Southeast Asian region as evidenced by the similar customs and traditions. Their presence here can be traced to the early migration of these Asians throughout the region. Today, the surviving tribes inhabiting the mountains of Bukidnon still bear the culture they have inherited from their ancestors.

Manolo Fortich is named after Don Manuel "Manolo" González Fortich, a provincial resident of Barrio Damilag who became the first governor (1907-1914) of the Sub-province of Bukidnon. Don Manuel Fortich was born on November 27, 1879, in San Nicolas (now Barangay Basak San Nicolas), Cebu City. A Philippine Constabulary officer, he served as a guide to Dean C. Worcester while on expedition to Bukidnon. Upon retirement from government service in 1920, he established ranches in Maluko and Maramag, and acquired 3,000 cows. He died on January 15, 1943, at the age of 64.

The original name of the town was Maluko, and was headed by Santiago Mambinonsad who was appointed as Alcalde de Barrio from 1922 to 1924. It was during the term of Ciriaco Asilan as Presidente del Barrio from 1926 to 1928, that the seat of municipal government was permanently transferred to Tangkulan. Mateo Gumaling was the first appointed municipal mayor of Maluko and in 1940 Margarito Cabang became the first elected Mayor.

=== World War II ===
Manolo Fortich was captured by Japanese forces of the Kawamura Detachment of the IJA 5th Division attacking from Cagayan on May 6, 1942. They advance further eastward two days later.

=== Post-war ===
Maluko was then renamed to Manolo Fortich by virtue of Republic Act No. 1720 on June 21, 1957.

== Geography ==
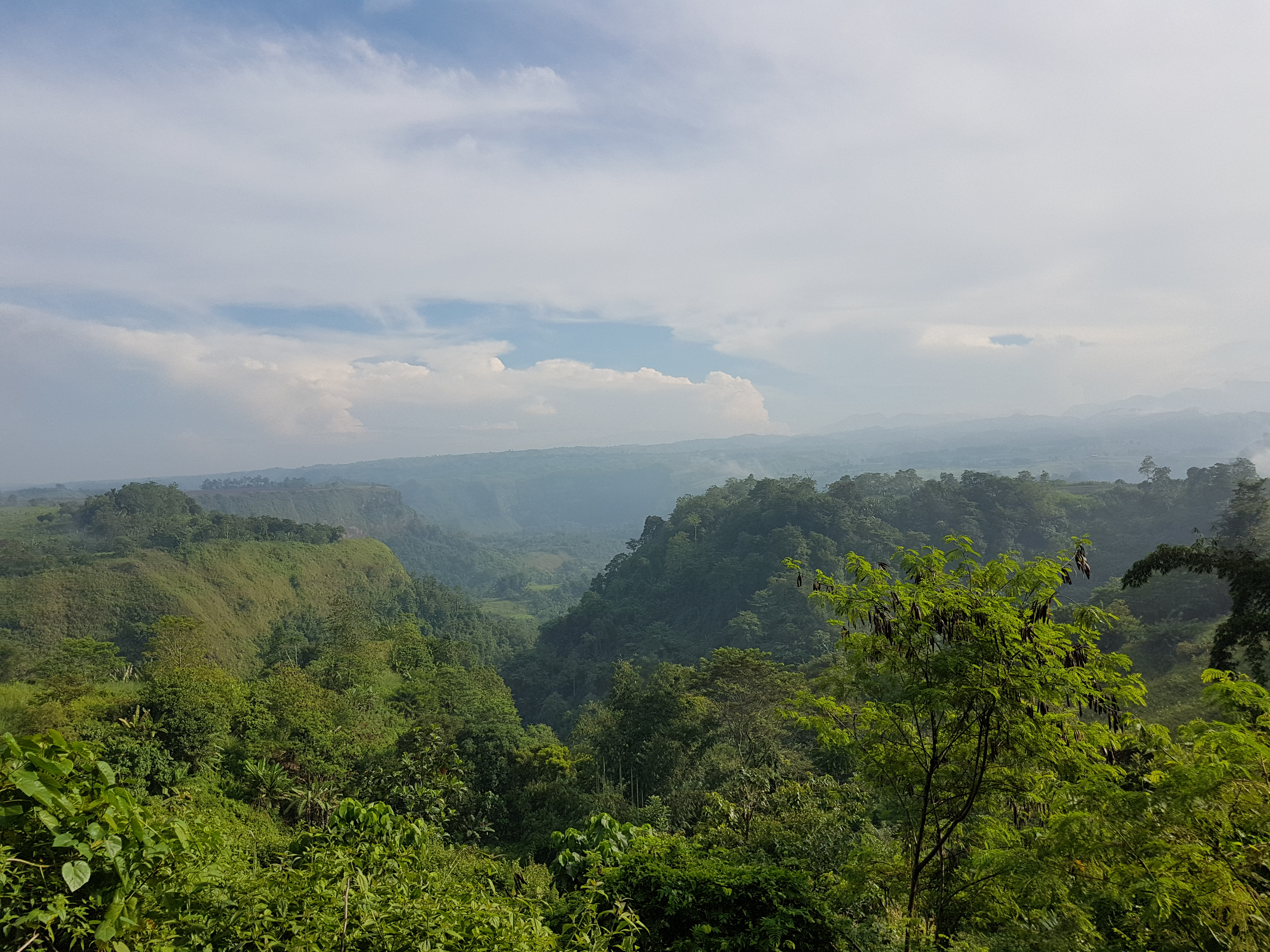
Mangima Canyon

The municipality of Manolo Fortich has a total area of 506.64 square kilometres (195.61 sq mi), accounting 6.1% of the total land area of the province of Bukidnon.

Manolo Fortich is situated in the northern part of the province of Bukidnon. It is about 40 minutes away from the bustling commercial center of Cagayan de Oro.

It is bounded in the north by Cagayan de Oro and the municipality of Malitbog. In the east by the municipality of Sumilao, in the west by the municipality of Libona and Baungon and in the south by the rugged ranges of Mount Kitanglad.

=== Barangays ===
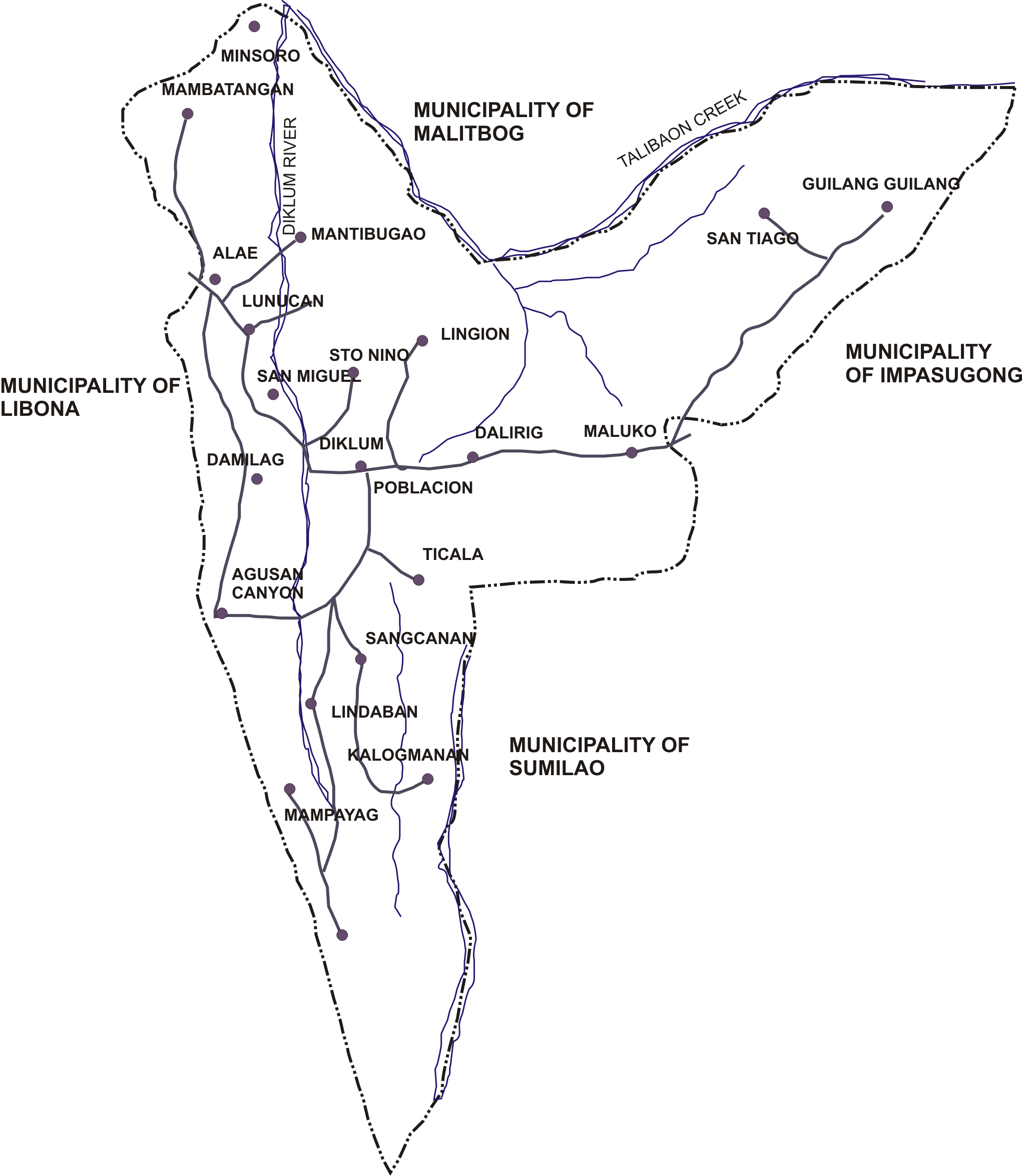
Manolo Fortich political map

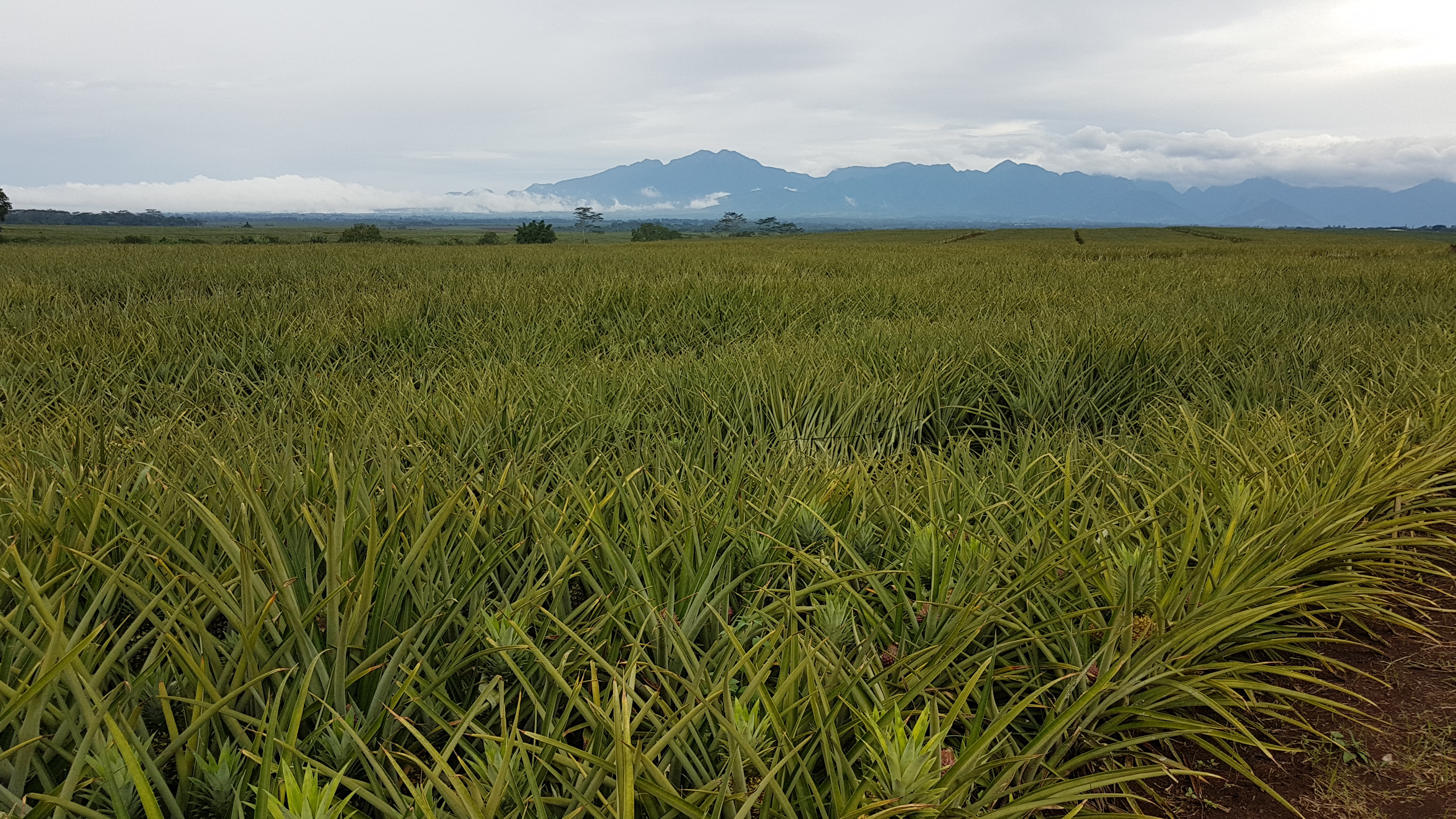
Del Monte Pineapple fields with the Kitanglad Mountain Range in the background from Camp Phillips

Manolo Fortich is politically subdivided into 22 barangays. Each barangay consists of puroks while some have sitios.

PSGC	Barangay	Population			±% p.a.	
		2024		2010		
101314001	Agusan Canyon	8.5%	9,985	9,850	▴	0.09%
101314002	Alae	7.7%	9,135	8,552	▴	0.46%
101314003	Dahilayan	1.5%	1,743	1,527	▴	0.92%
101314004	Dalirig	4.1%	4,844	3,541	▴	2.18%
101314005	Damilag	9.9%	11,713	11,385	▴	0.20%
101314006	Dicklum	3.4%	4,033	3,731	▴	0.54%
101314007	Guilang‑guilang	1.1%	1,247	1,152	▴	0.55%
101314008	Kalugmanan	3.1%	3,684	2,986	▴	1.46%
101314009	Lindaban	2.0%	2,325	2,017	▴	0.98%
101314010	Lingion	5.4%	6,336	5,496	▴	0.98%
101314011	Lunocan	6.2%	7,346	6,341	▴	1.02%
101314012	Maluko	3.5%	4,125	3,871	▴	0.44%
101314013	Mambatangan	3.7%	4,349	3,248	▴	2.03%
101314014	Mampayag	1.1%	1,334	1,312	▴	0.11%
101314015	Minsuro	0.8%	981	870	▴	0.83%
101314016	Mantibugao	2.7%	3,185	2,678	▴	1.20%
101314017	Tankulan (Poblacion)	7.4%	8,711	7,907	▴	0.67%
101314018	San Miguel	4.1%	4,867	4,524	▴	0.50%
101314019	Sankanan	3.2%	3,737	3,287	▴	0.89%
101314020	Santiago	1.3%	1,554	2,066	▾	−1.94%
101314021	Santo Niño	3.1%	3,704	3,445	▴	0.50%
101314023	Ticala	1.1%	1,272	1,240	▴	0.18%
	Total		118,075	91,026	▴	1.81%

=== Climate ===
Climate data for Manolo Fortich, Bukidnon
Month	Jan	Feb	Mar	Apr	May	Jun	Jul	Aug	Sep	Oct	Nov	Dec	Year
Mean daily maximum °C (°F)	25 (77)	25 (77)	26 (79)	28 (82)	27 (81)	27 (81)	27 (81)	27 (81)	27 (81)	26 (79)	26 (79)	25 (77)	26 (80)
Mean daily minimum °C (°F)	21 (70)	21 (70)	21 (70)	22 (72)	22 (72)	22 (72)	22 (72)	22 (72)	22 (72)	22 (72)	22 (72)	21 (70)	22 (71)
Average precipitation mm (inches)	271 (10.7)	217 (8.5)	193 (7.6)	178 (7.0)	344 (13.5)	423 (16.7)	362 (14.3)	358 (14.1)	329 (13.0)	320 (12.6)	322 (12.7)	260 (10.2)	3,577 (140.9)
Average rainy days	23.2	19.5	22.0	22.8	29.6	28.9	30.3	29.8	28.1	28.8	26.1	24.1	313.2
Source: Meteoblue (Use with caution: this is modeled/calculated data, not measured locally.)

The climate is classified as belonging to type IV or Intermediate. It is characterized by a moderate dry season with average rainfall of about 2,000 millimetres (79 in). Its temperature is relatively cool and humid making the place suitable for production of any kind of crops. Production of high valued crops, which include vegetables, cut flowers and ornamentals is a big potential in the area.

== Demographics ==
Population census of Manolo Fortich
Year	Pop.	±% p.a.
1918	3,780	—
1939	7,677	+3.43%
1948	9,560	+2.47%
1960	16,833	+4.83%
1970	27,159	+4.89%
1975	31,840	+3.24%
1980	42,493	+5.94%
1990	61,329	+3.74%
1995	67,400	+1.78%
2000	74,252	+2.10%
2007	82,051	+1.39%
2010	91,026	+3.85%
2015	100,210	+1.85%
2020	113,200	+2.60%
2024	118,075	+1.02%
Source: Philippine Statistics Authority

In the 2024 census, the population of Manolo Fortich was 118,075 people, with a density of 290 inhabitants per square kilometre or 750 inhabitants per square mile.

In the 2010 census, the population of the municipality was 91,026 people, up from 82,051 in 2007. Manolo Fortich belongs to a very low-density area which has only approximately 162 persons per square kilometre. The urban population is confined in barangays Agusan Canyon, Damilag and Tankulan.

=== Ethnic origin ===
There are three major ethnic groups in Manolo Fortich and they are the Higaonon, Talaandig and the Cebuano-Bohol ethnic groups, the latter were mostly migrants from Cebu and Bohol who came to work as agricultural laborers in the plantation and orchard farms of the highland plateau, about 55% of the residents are Higaonons who are indigenous people in the area.

=== Languages ===
Cebuano, a Visayan language, is the major spoken language of the town. In the upland barangay plateau areas of Dahilayan, Guilang-guilang, Kalugmanan, Santiago and Ticala, the Higa-onons and Talaandigs speak their indigenous language called "Binukid".

== Economy ==
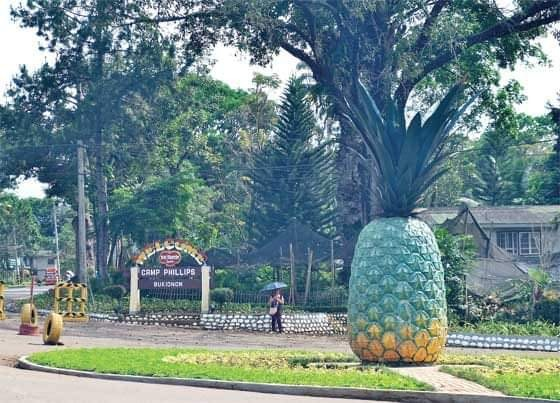
Del Monte welcome marker

Del Monte pineapple plantation

Poverty incidence of Manolo Fortich (%)

Source: Philippine Statistics Authority

While Del Monte Philippines' manufacturing plant is located in nearby Cagayan de Oro, yet its pineapple plantation is located in the municipality specifically in Camp Phillips Road, Barangay Agusan Canyon while the company's clubhouse is located at Barangay San Miguel, still in Camp Phillips Road. The Del Monte Golf Course & Country Club on the other hand is located in Sitio Cawayanon, Barangay San Miguel. Just a few meters from the golf course is the Del Monte School, still located in Sitio Cawayanon. The Cawayanon Compound also located in Sitio Cawayanon is a residential area mostly inhabited by Del Monte employees.

== Infrastructure ==
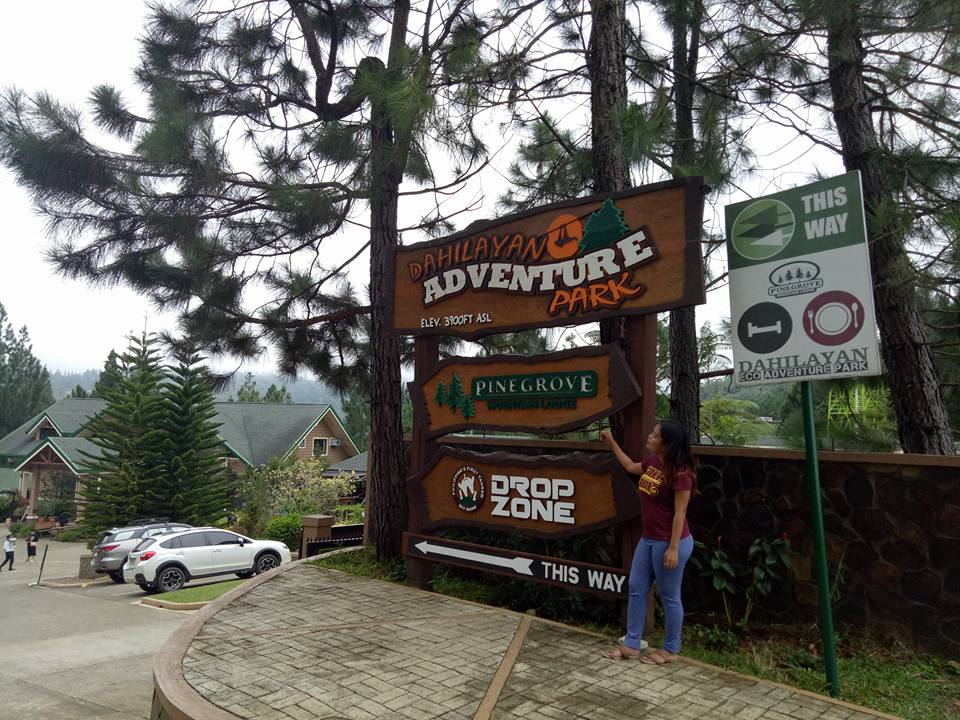

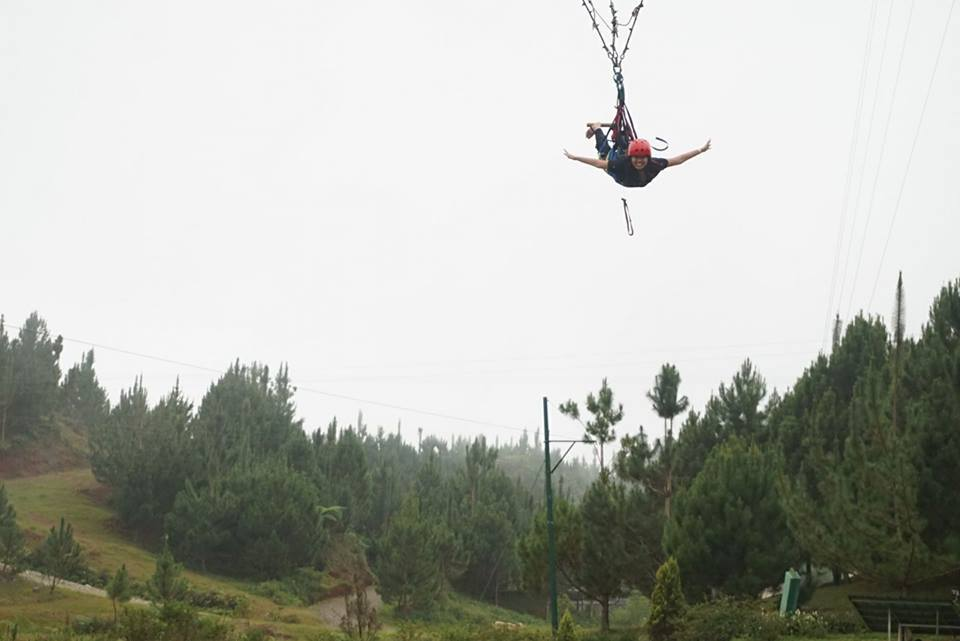
The Dahilayan Adventure Park is located in the municipality. The park is popular for its single and dual zip-lines, drop zones, Sky Tower Base Jump (the highest of its kind in the country), "Python Roller Zipride" (the first of its kind in Asia) and the "Flying Lizard" canopy glider. The park's dual zipline has 840 meters in length making it Asia's longest dual zip-line.

=== Water/drainage systems ===
Manolo Fortich has three major river systems crisscrossing the upstream and downstream agricultural lands. These are the Tagoloan, Mangima and Agusan Rivers, which serve as natural boundaries and drainage of excess water and run-off from around the municipality. The other rivers of the municipality are, among others: Dicklum, Kumaykay, Guihian, Tasaon and Kulaman Rivers. The river systems also serve as sources of potable water supply for domestic use. About 26 creeks spread across nine barangays in the municipality.

=== Natural resources ===
==== Forests ====
Forest areas in Manolo Fortich are found in two barangays along the Mt. Kitanglad Range. Mt. Kitanglad hosts a diverse species of flora and fauna, many of them rare and endemic, making it a potential for tourism and bio-diversity research.

==== Minerals ====
The major metallic mineral found in the municipality is chromite and the non-metallic includes semi-precious stones. Also available are clay, limestone, feldspar, silica quartz and schist.

== Notable personalities ==
- Melvin Jerusalem - Professional boxer

== See also ==
- List of renamed cities and municipalities in the Philippines
