= Lantapan =

Municipality in Bukidnon, Philippines

- Municipality
- Municipality of Lantapan
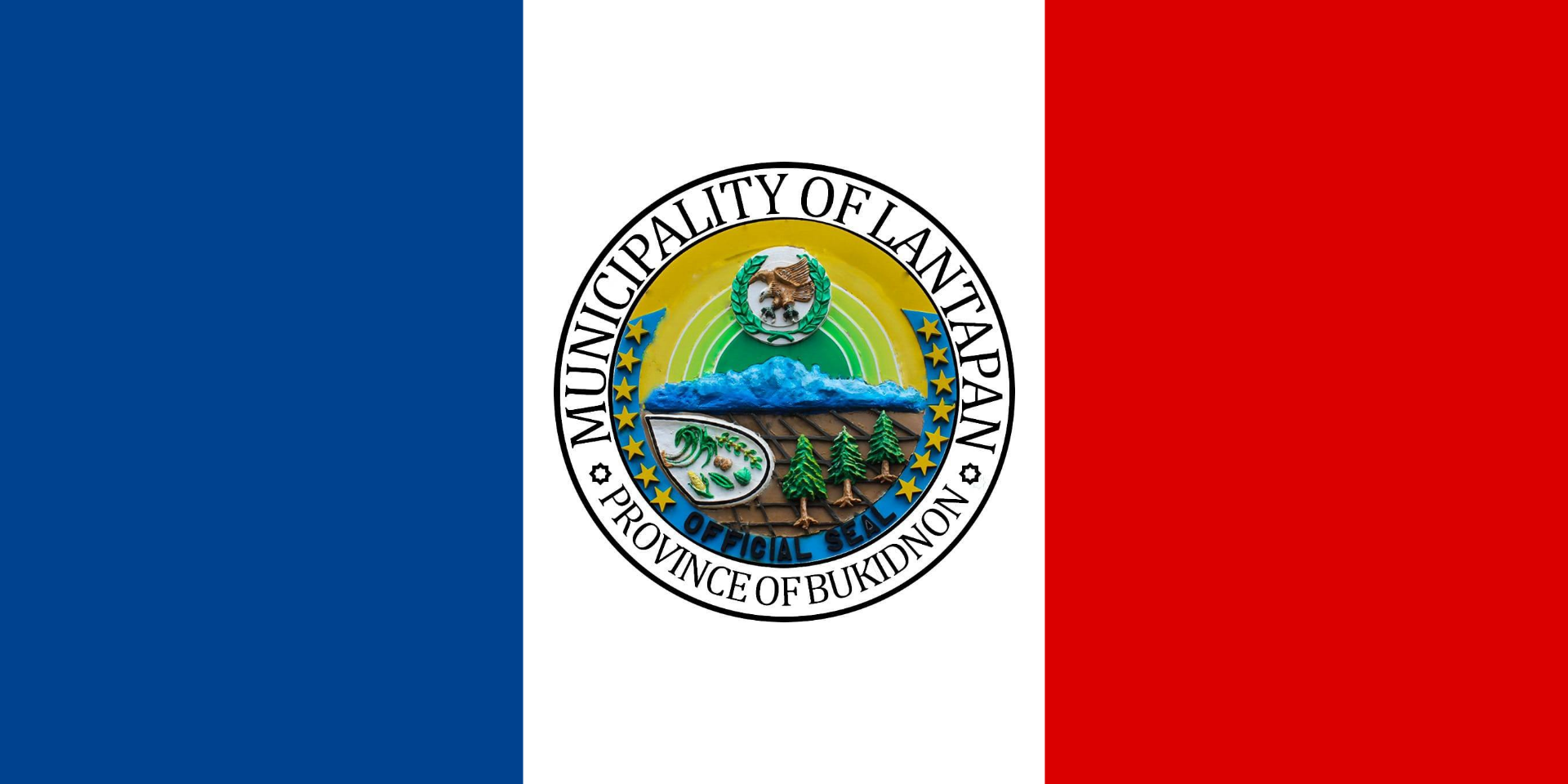
- Flag Seal
- Nickname: Heart of Bukidnon
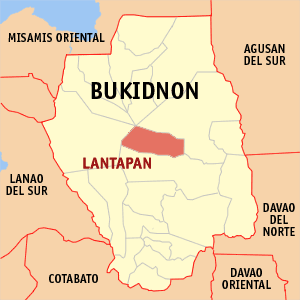
- Map of Bukidnon with Lantapan highlighted
- Interactive map of Lantapan
- Location within the Philippines
- Coordinates: 8°00′00″N 125°01′24″E
- Country: Philippines
- Region: Northern Mindanao
- Province: Bukidnon
- District: 2nd district
- Founded: June 18, 1968
- Barangays: 14 (see Barangays)

Government
  - Type: Sangguniang Bayan
  - Mayor: Ricky James D. Balansag
  - Vice Mayor: Ernie R. Devibar
  - Representative: Jonathan Keith T. Flores
  - Municipal Council: Members: Sulpicio D. Gallano Jr.; Eric R. Devibar; Neil Joshua C. Luardo; Ranillo S. Yam-oc; Aurora L. Rubio; Cynthia R. Maraveles; Hernie G. Enot; Miguel C. Ledres
  - Electorate: 41,692 voters (2025)

Area
  - Total: 328.35 km^{2} (126.78 sq mi)
- Elevation: 961 m (3,153 ft)
- Highest elevation: 1,601 m (5,253 ft)
- Lowest elevation: 530 m (1,740 ft)

Population (2024 census)
  - Total: 68,777
  - Density: 209.46/km^{2} (542.51/sq mi)
  - Households: 14,653

Economy
  - Income class: 1st municipal income class
  - Poverty incidence: 32.64% (2023)
  - Revenue: ₱ 322.9 million (2024)
  - Assets: ₱ 1,305 million (2024)
  - Expenditure: ₱ 294.3 million (2024)
  - Liabilities: ₱ 401.7 million (2024)

Service provider
  - Electricity: Bukidnon 2 Electric Cooperative (BUSECO)
- Time zone: UTC+8 (PST)
- ZIP code: 8722
- PSGC: 1001310000
- IDD : area code: +63 (0)88
- Native languages: Binukid; Cebuano; Ata Manobo; Tagalog
- Website: www.lantapanbuk.gov.ph

Lantapan, officially the Municipality of Lantapan (Bukid and Higaonon: Banuwa ta Lantapan; Cebuano: Lungsod sa Lantapan; Tagalog: Bayan ng Lantapan), is a municipality in the province of Bukidnon, Philippines. According to the 2024 census, it has a population of 68,777 people.

Lantapan is known as the “vegetable basket” of Mindanao.

It used to be a barrio of Malaybalay until its creation, by virtue of Republic Act No. 4787 enacted on June 18, 1968, as a separate municipality.

== Geography ==
The town is on a plateau in the heart of Bukidnon, situated between the Kalatungan and Kitanglad Mountain Ranges, after which its native name of "lantapan" was derived which means "level-on-top".

Lantapan is bounded on the north by the municipalities of Sumilao and Impasugong; east by Malaybalay City; south by Valencia City; and west by Talakag. It lies above sea level at an average of 600 metres (2,000 ft) and a maximum of 2,938 metres (9,639 ft) of the Kitanglad range.

It has an aggregate area of 318.2 km^{2}, mostly agriculture and forest lands. It has six river channels and 40 creeks and springs traversing across different points in the landscape. Lantapan is strategically located between two cities of Bukidnon, Malaybalay and Valencia. It can be reached via Aglayan crossing, which is a potential convergent zone of four cities: Iligan, Butuan, Davao and Cagayan de Oro.

=== Barangays ===
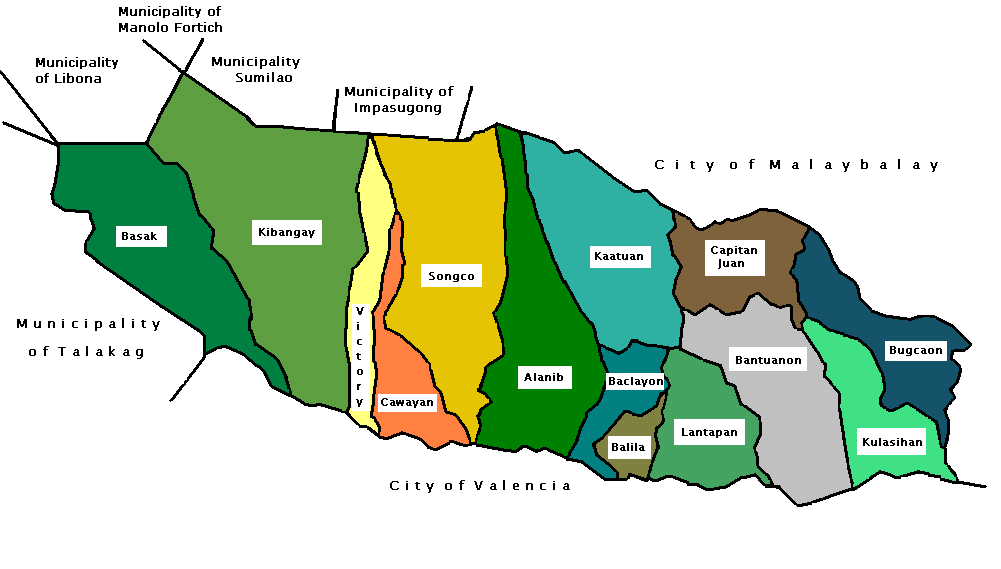
Political map of Lantapan showing its barangays

Lantapan is politically subdivided into 14 barangays. Each barangay consists of puroks while some have sitios.

PSGC	Barangay	Population			±% p.a.	
		2024		2010		
101310001	Alanib	9.4%	6,436	5,811	▴	0.71%
101310002	Baclayon	2.7%	1,881	1,734	▴	0.56%
101310003	Balila	5.4%	3,747	3,633	▴	0.21%
101310004	Bantuanon	8.9%	6,130	5,671	▴	0.54%
101310005	Basak	4.9%	3,373	3,052	▴	0.69%
101310006	Bugcaon	7.9%	5,412	5,182	▴	0.30%
101310007	Ka‑atoan (Kaatuan)	2.6%	1,775	1,624	▴	0.62%
101310008	Capitan Juan	3.1%	2,156	1,805	▴	1.24%
101310009	Cawayan	3.9%	2,710	2,631	▴	0.20%
101310010	Kulasihan	9.4%	6,433	5,565	▴	1.01%
101310011	Kibangay	11.4%	7,867	7,107	▴	0.70%
101310012	Poblacion	11.7%	8,025	7,142	▴	0.81%
101310013	Songco	5.4%	3,737	3,236	▴	1.00%
101310014	Victory	3.0%	2,094	1,741	▴	1.28%
	Total		68,777	55,934	▴	1.44%

=== Flora and fauna ===
Lantapan's virgin forests are home to a diverse variety of flora and fauna. There are orchids, berries, pitcher plants, lichens, and a host of other wild flowers. A number of mammal species also thrive in the dense forests, including squirrels, monkeys, bats, flying lemurs, deer, tarsiers and wild pigs among others. The Philippine eagle (Pithecophaga jefferyi) along with other bird species such as the serpent eagle and sparrow hawk takes its home within the Mt. Kitanglad Range.

=== Climate ===
Climate data for Lantapan, Bukidnon
Month	Jan	Feb	Mar	Apr	May	Jun	Jul	Aug	Sep	Oct	Nov	Dec	Year
Mean daily maximum °C (°F)	24 (75)	24 (75)	26 (79)	27 (81)	26 (79)	25 (77)	25 (77)	25 (77)	26 (79)	25 (77)	25 (77)	25 (77)	25 (78)
Mean daily minimum °C (°F)	18 (64)	18 (64)	18 (64)	19 (66)	20 (68)	20 (68)	20 (68)	19 (66)	20 (68)	20 (68)	19 (66)	19 (66)	19 (66)
Average precipitation mm (inches)	118 (4.6)	73 (2.9)	66 (2.6)	74 (2.9)	175 (6.9)	261 (10.3)	271 (10.7)	281 (11.1)	267 (10.5)	258 (10.2)	164 (6.5)	93 (3.7)	2,101 (82.9)
Average rainy days	16.0	13.8	12.4	13.1	24.2	27.6	28.9	28.5	27.1	27.4	21.0	16.1	256.1
Source: Meteoblue

The climatic condition of Lantapan is relatively cool and humid for Philippine standards with winds blowing at a northward direction. The temperature around noon tends to be 5-7 °C cooler than nearby coastal areas to the north. November to April is relatively dry and May brings the start of the rains which continue 'til October. Mountains of neighboring towns in the north protect it from cyclone storms.

== Demographics ==
Population census of Lantapan
Year	Pop.	±% p.a.
1970	14,523	—
1975	20,006	+6.63%
1980	22,678	+2.54%
1990	33,581	+4.00%
1995	36,943	+1.80%
2000	42,383	+2.99%
2007	51,406	+2.70%
2010	55,934	+3.12%
2015	61,776	+1.91%
2020	65,974	+1.39%
2024	68,777	+1.00%
Source: Philippine Statistics Authority

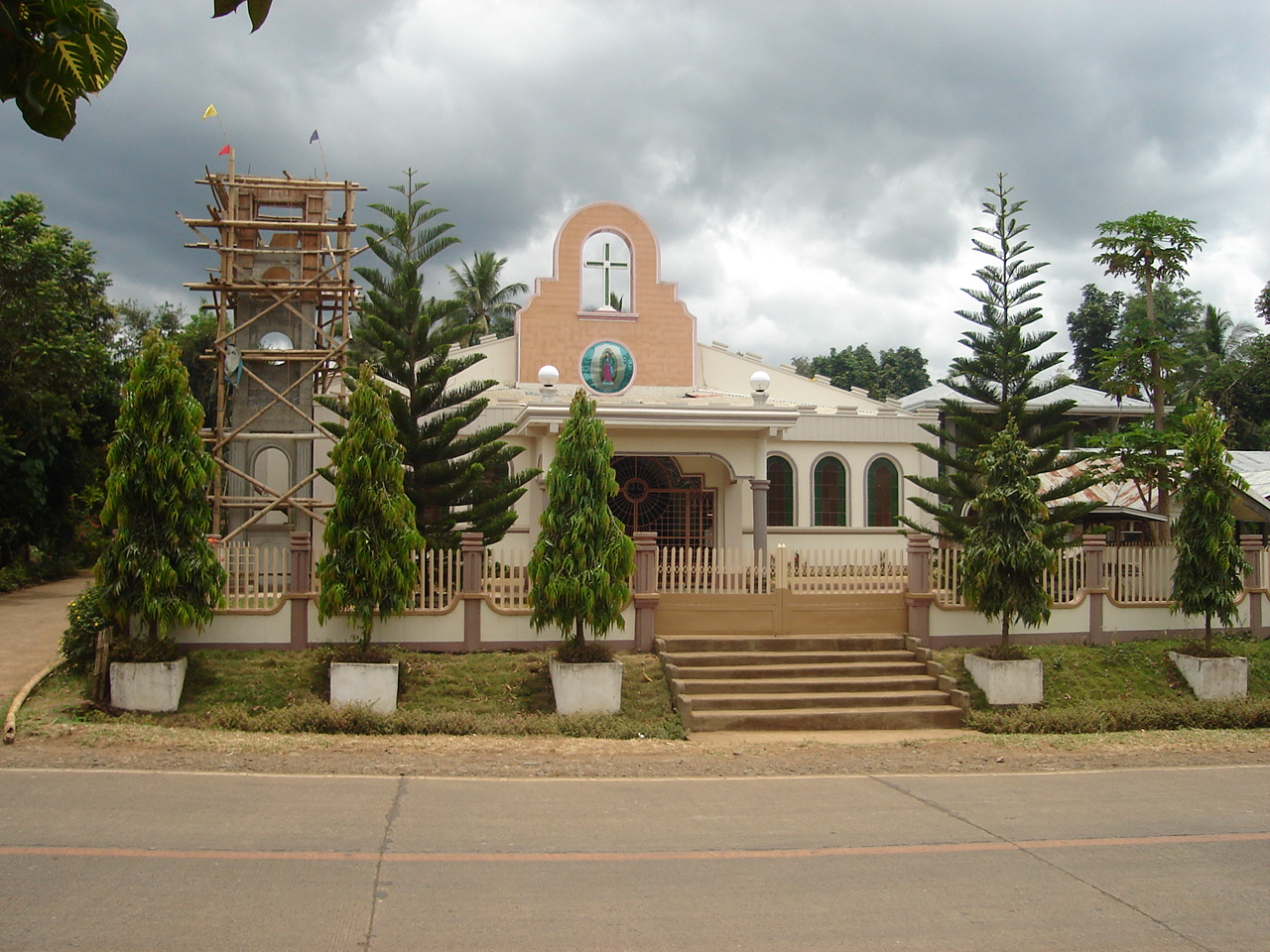
The main religion of the Visayas and Luzon migrants is Roman Catholicism as evident in this chapel located in Poblacion, Lantapan.

In the 2024 census, the population of Lantapan was 68,777 people, with a density of 210 inhabitants per square kilometre or 540 inhabitants per square mile.

Originally, the Talaandig were the main inhabitants of Lantapan. Then, migrants from the Visayas and northern Luzon started to settle in the area, even during the Spanish colonial period. More inflow took place after the Second World War. This stream of settlers eventually led to the varied mix of ethnic groups in Lantapan. Visayan is the predominant language, followed by Binukid. The 2010 Census showed Lantapan's population had reached 55,934 with the Poblacion as the most populated barangay. Its population growth rate between 1980 and 1990 of 4.18% was well above the national rate of 2.3 percent.

The Talaandig (one of the seven Indigenous peoples of Bukidnon) ancestral territory includes Barangay Songco, where there are attempts to preserve Indigenous ways and customary law. A school for living tradition was built to teach the young the traditional Talaandig way of life, including its history, rituals, music, arts, embroidery, dance, and literature. Other activities involved earth paintings (painting utilizing soil as a medium), singing and dancing to traditional music, and making musical instruments and Indigenous accessories among others.

== Economy ==
Poverty incidence of Lantapan (%)

Source: Philippine Statistics Authority

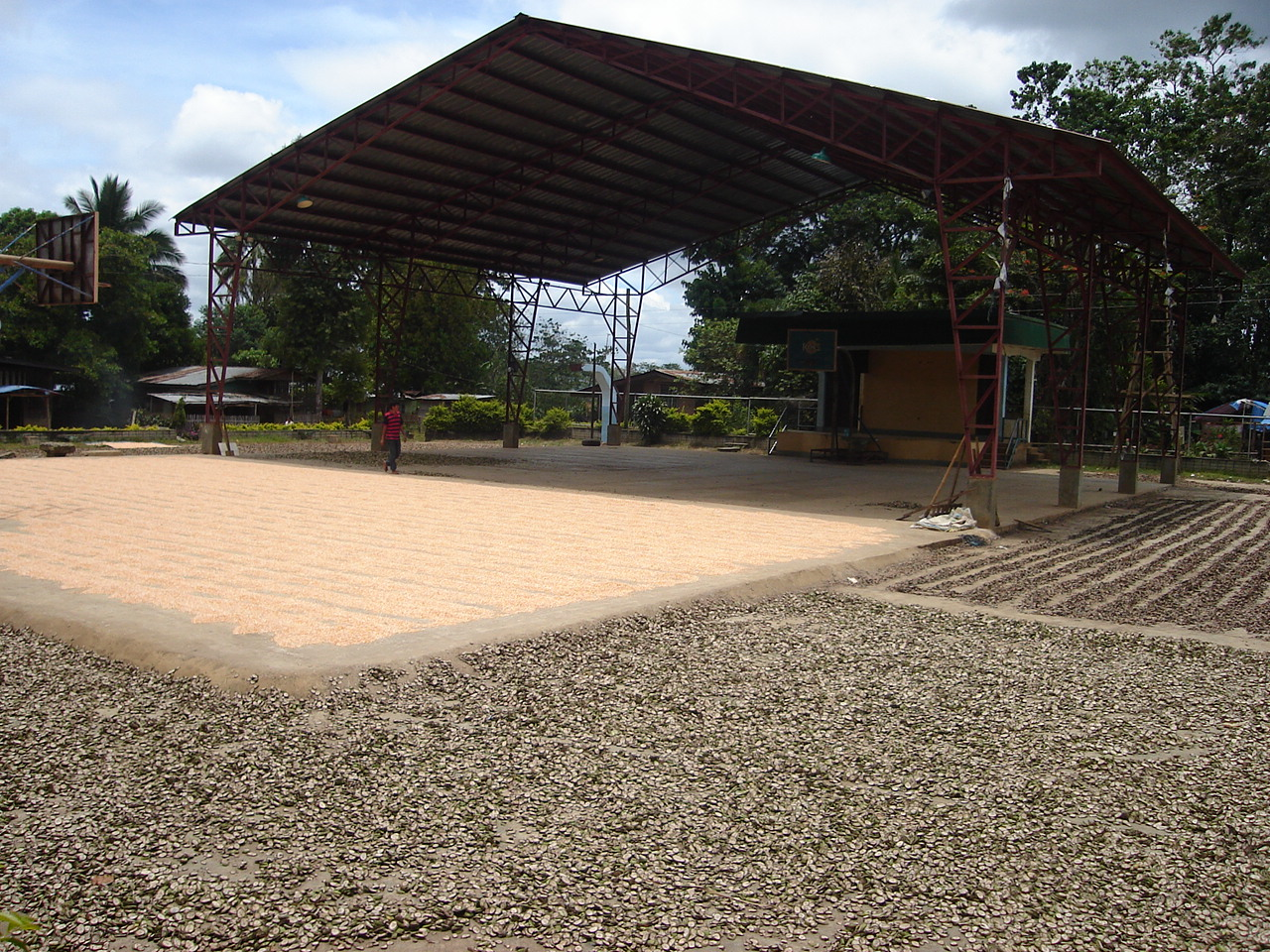
Cassava chips and corn being dried in the community solar dryer. Lantapan's economy is basically agri-based.

Agriculture

Lantapan has agriculture-based economy. Farming has remained a dominant economic activity among the Lantapanons. The major crops grown are corn, coffee, cabbage and potatoes, sugarcane and other high valued crops and bananas also becoming an important commercial crop.

Lantapan is also home to two banana plantations: the Mount Kitanglad Agri-Ventures Inc. (MKAVI) and the Dole Banana Plantation with thousands of hectares of lands in the highland-barangays of the town planted with export quality bananas. The plantations started their operation in 1998 with thousand of residents of the municipality employed.

Commerce

There are 428 commercial establishments registered at the Licensing Division of the municipality, 15 of which are classified under agro-industrial, manufacturing and servicing. Trading activities include wholesale buying of corn, coffee and vegetables by traders from within Lantapan, neighboring towns in Bukidnon and Cagayan de Oro.

Finance

For finance, the informal credit or "suki" system prevails. In this arrangement, the trader is usually the "suki" who provides credit too and buys the products of the farmer. A few cooperatives in some barangays also extend small loans to their members. An Asian Hills Bank located at the Poblacion and established in 1978, is owned by a private corporation. Its portfolio includes agricultural, commercial and real estate loans.

== Tourism ==
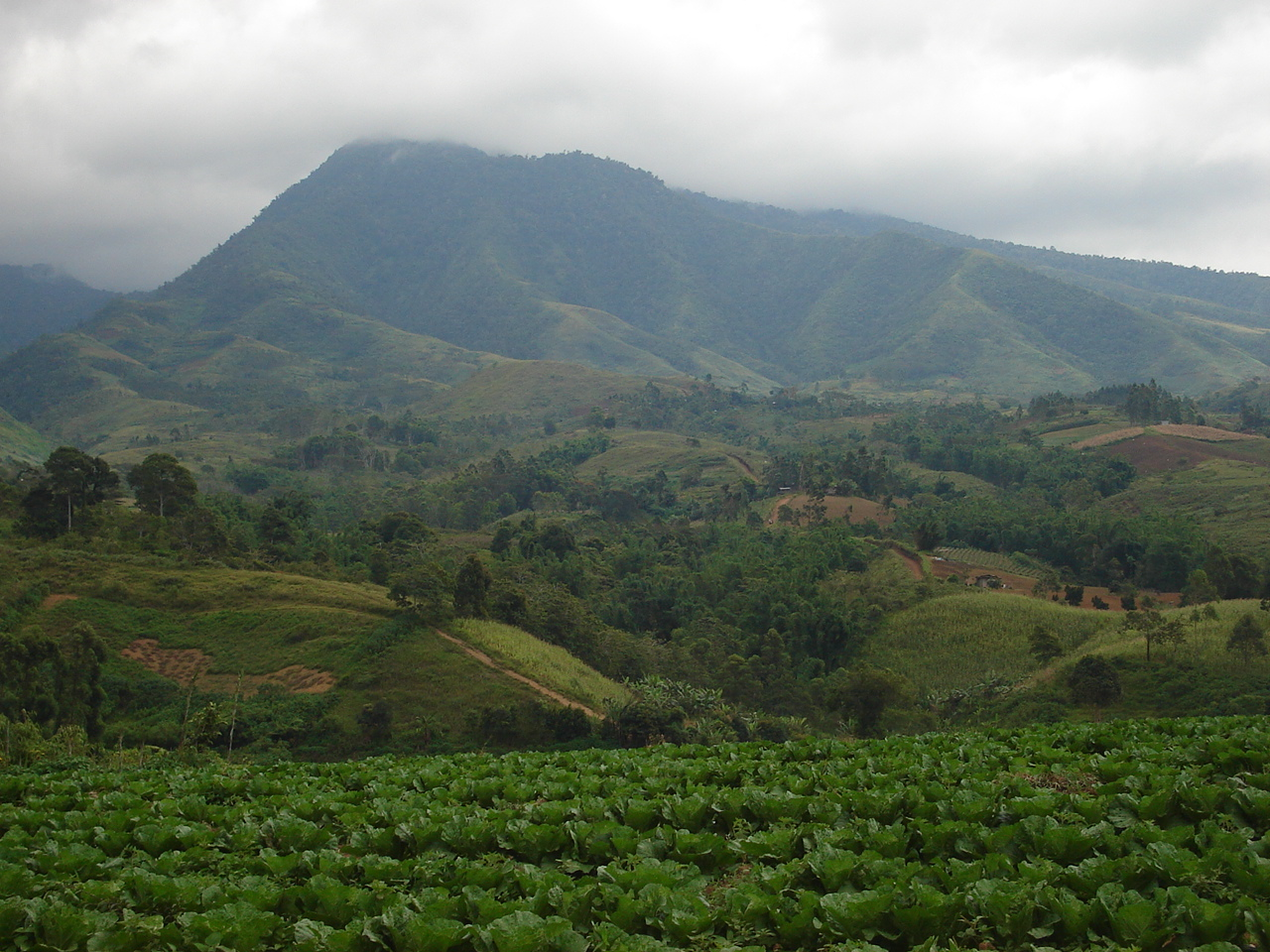
Kitanglad Mountain Range as viewed from Songco

Kitanglad Mountain Range
The Kitanglad Mountain Range is a very significant landmark in the cultural history of the Indigenous peoples of Bukidnon with Mount Dulang-dulang considered as a sacred place. Being an ancestral domain, permission to enter must be secured from the tribal leaders of the Talaandig people of Lantapan in deference to the Free, Prior and Informed Consent (FPIC) mandated by the Indigenous Peoples' Rights Act.

The long trek to Mount Dulang-dulang’s summit goes through virgin dense forests, home to old trees covered with moss and lichens. At the highest peak, there is a panoramic view of the entire Kitanglad range, and on clear days, the distant Mount Apo. Sitio Bol-ogan in Barangay Songco of Lantapan is the shortest route towards the major start point to the peaks of Mount Kitanglad (with an elevation of 2,938 metres (9,639 ft) above sea level) and Mount Dulang-dulang (with an elevation of 2,987 metres (9,800 ft) above sea level) which is the country’s second-highest mountain, next to Mount Apo at 3,144 metres (10,315 ft) above sea level.

Cinchona Forest Reserve
The Cinchona Forest Reserve was established through a presidential proclamation in 1936, and now forms part of the protected area of the Mount Kitanglad Range Natural Park. It is home to the Cinchona Plantation, established at Barangay Kaatuan in 1929, and said to be the only of its kind left in Asia and the Pacific where the medicinal plant Cinchona (Cinchona ledgeriana) is grown. Cinchona, is a medium-sized tropical tree that can grow up 24 metres (79 ft) with a 60 centimetres (24 in) diameter, is a source of quinine that is used for malaria treatment. The farm covers an area of 1,725 hectares (4,260 acres) where 7 Cinchona tree species are found and is planted mostly with Albizza falcataria (= Falcataria moluccana) and other medicinal trees. Located 1,140 metres (3,740 ft) above sea level, the area is considered as the coldest place in Bukidnon with temperatures ranging from 13 to 18 °C (55 to 64 °F).

Binahon Agro-forestry Farm
The Binahon Agro-forestry Farm, located at Sitio Bol-ogan, Barangay Songco, on the slopes of Mt. Kitanglad, is a learning institution for farmers, agriculturists, and rural development workers. Situated some 1,300 metres (4,300 ft) above sea level, it cultivates various forest species such as Caribbean pine trees, lawaan, falcata, abaca, and eucalyptus. Fruit trees are also planted in the area with vegetables sown in between. Farm animals such as carabaos, horse, goats, sheep, hogs and other livestock animals are grown in the farm together with honeybees and tilapia. The farm also offers facilities for lodging to visiting tourists, researchers, scientists and mountaineers.

Barangay Kaatuan is also home to 8 conjoint water falls: seven water falls pouring its contents onto another water falls. This conjoint waterfall is supplied by the Kulasihan River, and situated five kilometers from the barangay proper of Kaatuan called Block 2.

== Infrastructure ==
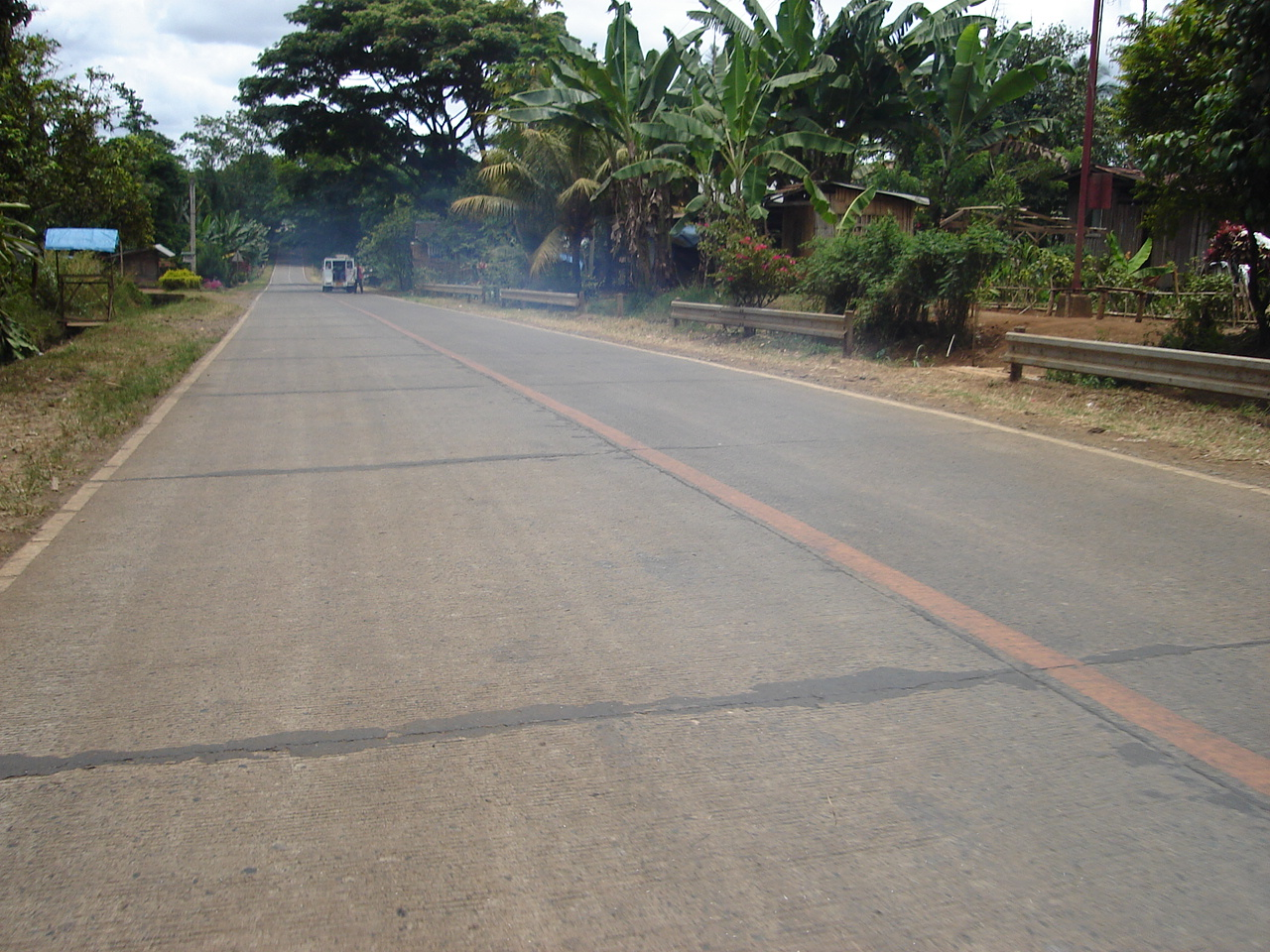
The municipality of Lantapan has a fairly well-paved road system especially the National Road the runs lengthwise through the municipality.

=== Health services ===
The rural health unit (RHU) maintains one central health unit and 14 barangay health stations. The RHU provides medical, dental, family planning and laboratory services. It provides special care and rehabilitation to malnourished children. One privately owned clinic for urgent care on minor cases and two registered mini-pharmaceutical stores are found in the Poblacion.

=== Water ===
Potable water is distributed through individual installations of 3,958 households. A feasibility study is being developed for the establishments of an improved and modern water system for Lantapan which entails tapping the Kulasihan and Songco water sources for an estimated flow of 45,018.168 cubic meters per hour.

=== Security ===
Lantapan is generally peaceful. Security in the area is ably maintained by the local police force. Trained civilian forces, the "Bantay-Bayan", the Barangay Tanod and the Civilian Volunteer Organization (CVO) in the barangays also provide support to crime prevention.

== Education ==
Presently, there is a total of 24 primary, elementary and secondary schools in Lantapan. These schools serve approximately 7,000 children. Day care centers under the Department of Social Welfare and Development provide preparatory education to pre-schoolers in the barangays.
