= Kitanglad Mountain Range =

Mountain range in Bukidnon, Philippines

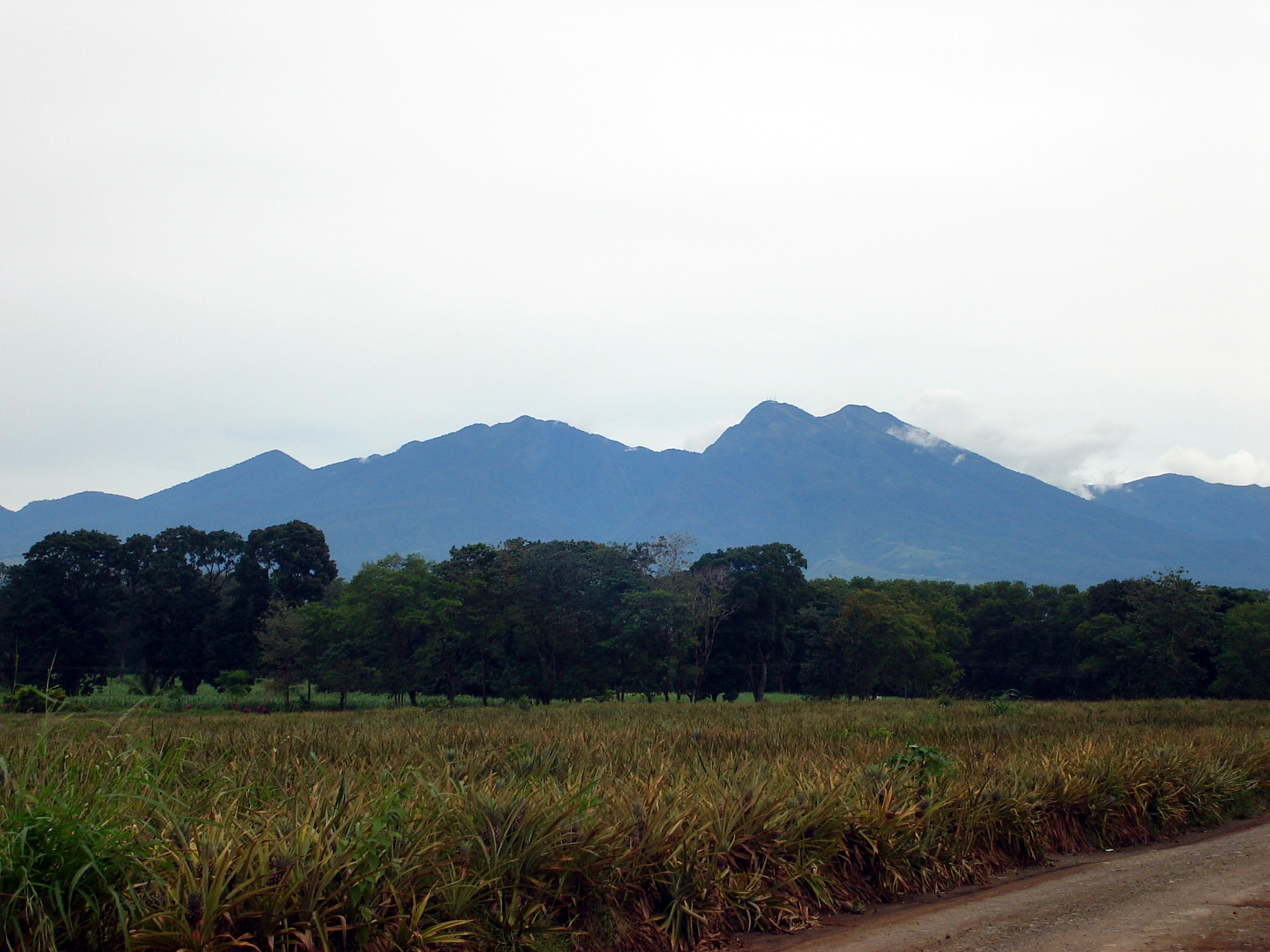
- The central portion of the Kitanglad Mountain Range where the two highest peaks in the range are found, Mt. Dulang-dulang and Mt. Kitanglad

Highest point
- Peak: Mount Dulang-dulang
- Elevation: 2,941 m (9,649 ft)

Dimensions
- Length: 46 km (29 mi) east-west
- Width: 19.3 km (12.0 mi) north - south
- Area: 750 km^{2} (290 mi^{2})

Geography
- Location within Philippines
- Country: Philippines
- Region: Northern Mindanao
- District: Bukidnon
- Settlement: Malaybalay
- Range coordinates: 8°08′N 124°55′E

The Kitanglad Mountain Range dominates the northern central portion of the province of Bukidnon, Philippines. It occupies portions of eight of the municipalities and cities in the province such as Talakag, Baungon, Libona, Manolo Fortich, Impasugong, Lantapan and Malaybalay. The range is one of the few remaining rainforests in the Philippines, hosting one of the most important diverse species of rare and endemic wildlife such as the Philippine eagle. Five of its peaks have very high elevations: Mount Dulang-dulang, the highest at 2,941 m (9,649 ft); Mount Kitanglad at 2,899 meters; Mount Maagnaw at 2,742 meters; Mount Lumuluyaw at 2,612 meters; and Mount Tuminungan at 2,400 meters.

The name "kitanglad" was derived from a legend that there was once a great flood that submerged the native lands of Bukidnon and only the tip of the mountain, the size of a "tanglad" (lemon grass), remained visible ("kita" in Cebuano).

== Peaks ==
List of peaks in Kitanglad Range by elevation.

- Mount Dulang-dulang 9,649 ft (2,941 m)
- Mount Kitanglad 9,511 ft (2,899 m)
- Mount Maagnaw 8,996 ft (2,742 m)
- Mount Alanib 8,934 feet (2,723 m)
- Mount Tuminungan 8,888 ft (2,709 m)
- Mount Lumuluyaw 8,569 ft (2,612 m)
- Mount Nanluyaw 8,540 ft (2,603 m)

== History ==
The whole range was declared a national park by virtue of Presidential Proclamation No. 677 on December 4, 1990, known as the Mount Kitanglad Range Natural Park. In 1994, it was chosen as one of the 10 priority sites under the World Bank through the Conservation of Priority Protected Areas Project. Mount Kitanglad and its outlying area was proclaimed a protected area under the natural park category through Presidential Proclamation 896 dated October 24, 1996. On November 9, 2000, the park finally became a full-fledged protected area when Congress approved R.A. 8978 also known as the Mt. Kitanglad Range Protected Area Act of 2000.

== Geographical location ==
Kitanglad Mountain Range is located in the northern central part of Bukidnon province, directly north of the neighboring Kalatungan Mountain Range. It lies in between 8°7′42″N and 124°55′30″E. It is bounded in the west by Talakag, northwest by Baungon, on the north by Libona and Manolo Fortich, on the northeast by Impasugong, on the east by Malaybalay City and on the south by Lantapan.

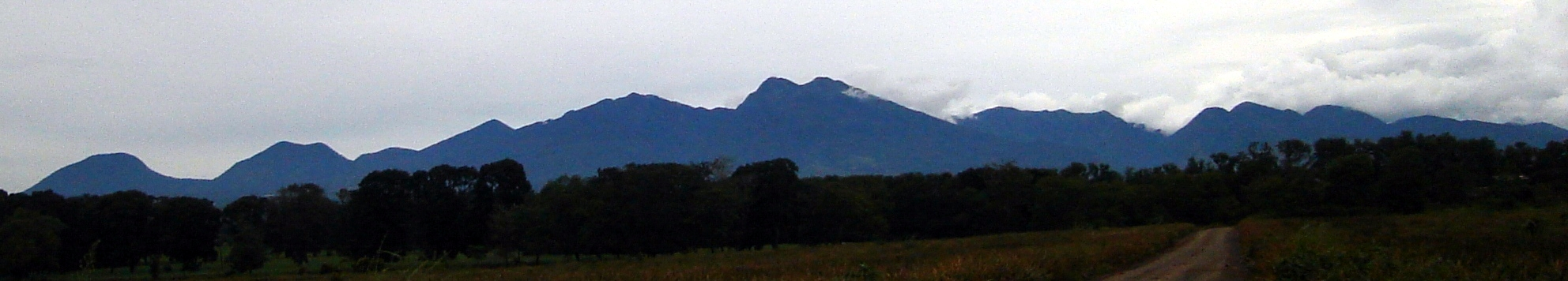
Panoramic view of the Kitanglad Mountain Range from Poblacion, Impasug-ong, Bukidnon.

== Climate ==
The climate at the Kitanglad Ranges falls under the Modified Corona Classification, which is characterized by a short dry season usually lasting from one to three months, and no pronounced rainy season. The area is cloud-covered all year round.

Temperature ranges from 22.7 °C in January to 24.6 °C in June. It receives the highest amount of rainfall in June. The driest period is March.

== Biodiversity ==
The Mount Kitanglad range hosts a diverse population of plant and animal species, including many threatened and restricted-range bird species. Among the bird species found in the area are the Mindanao lorikeet, Mindanao racquet-tail, Mindanao scops owl, slaty-backed jungle-flycatcher, red-eared parrotfinch, and Apo myna.

The mountain hosts two newly discovered species of land-based mammals: a shrew-mouse and a moss-mouse.

Other important mammals include the Philippine deer, bearded pig, Mindanao gymnure, long-tailed Macaque, Mindanao tree shrew, Philippine flying lemur, Philippine pygmy squirrel, Mindanao flying squirrel. There are also rare bats such as the endemic Mindanao pygmy fruit bat.

== Hydrological features ==
The Kitanglad Mountain Range forms the headwater catchment area of several major river systems draining north and central Mindanao. Among these rivers are the Cagayan River, Tagoloan River, and Pulangi River, a major tributary of the Rio Grande de Mindanao. Drainage in the area is in a characteristic radial pattern, emanating from the highest points in the range.

== See also ==
- List of protected areas of the Philippines
