= List of Bohol festivals =

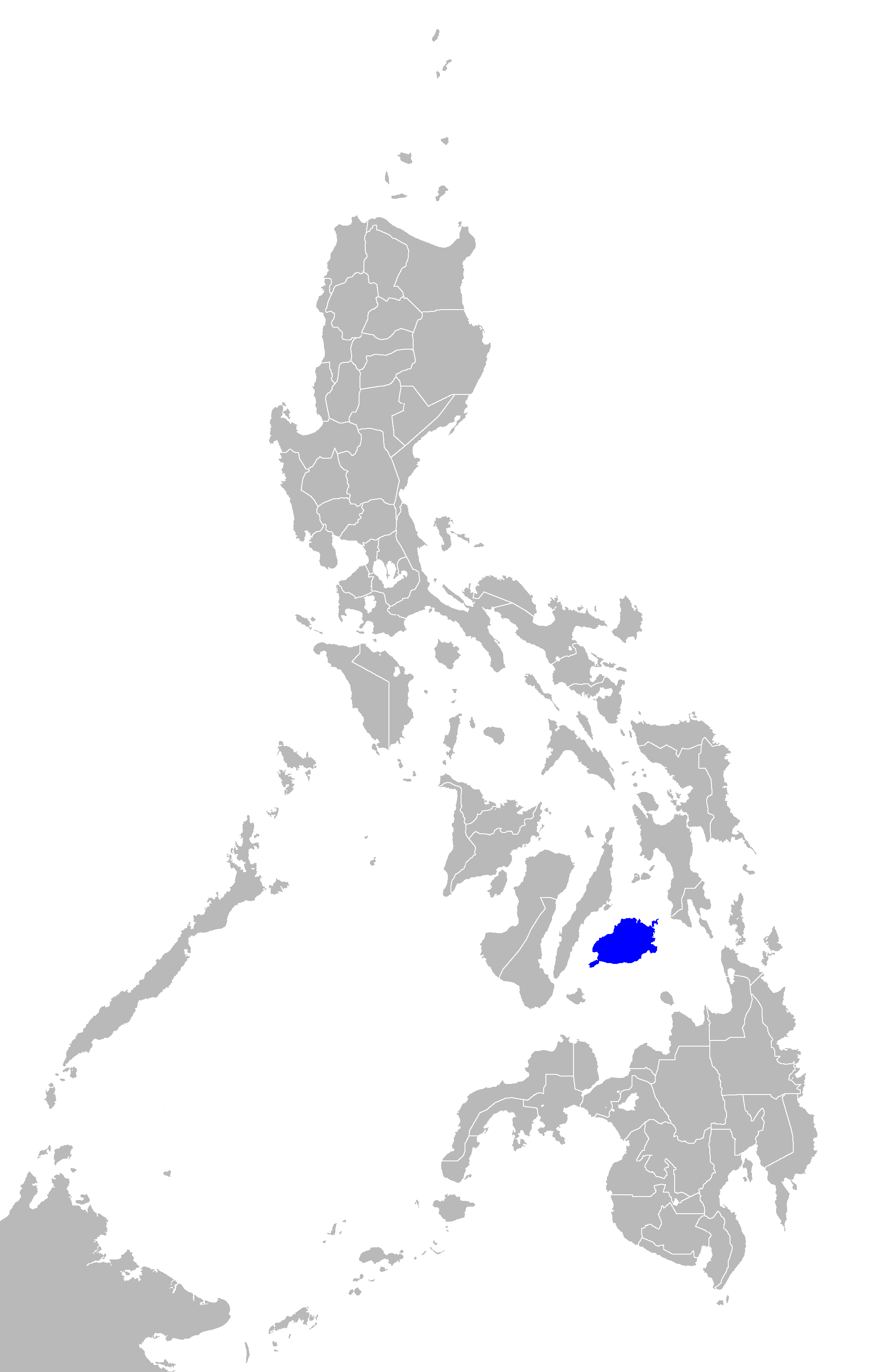
Locator map of Bohol

Every year, each town and barangay or even sitio / purok celebrates its fiesta in honor their patron saints. During this time, streets are often filled with colors, lights, and banners to signify the fiesta season. It's been a tradition for Boholanos around the world to return to their respective hometowns during fiesta for homecoming and family reunions.

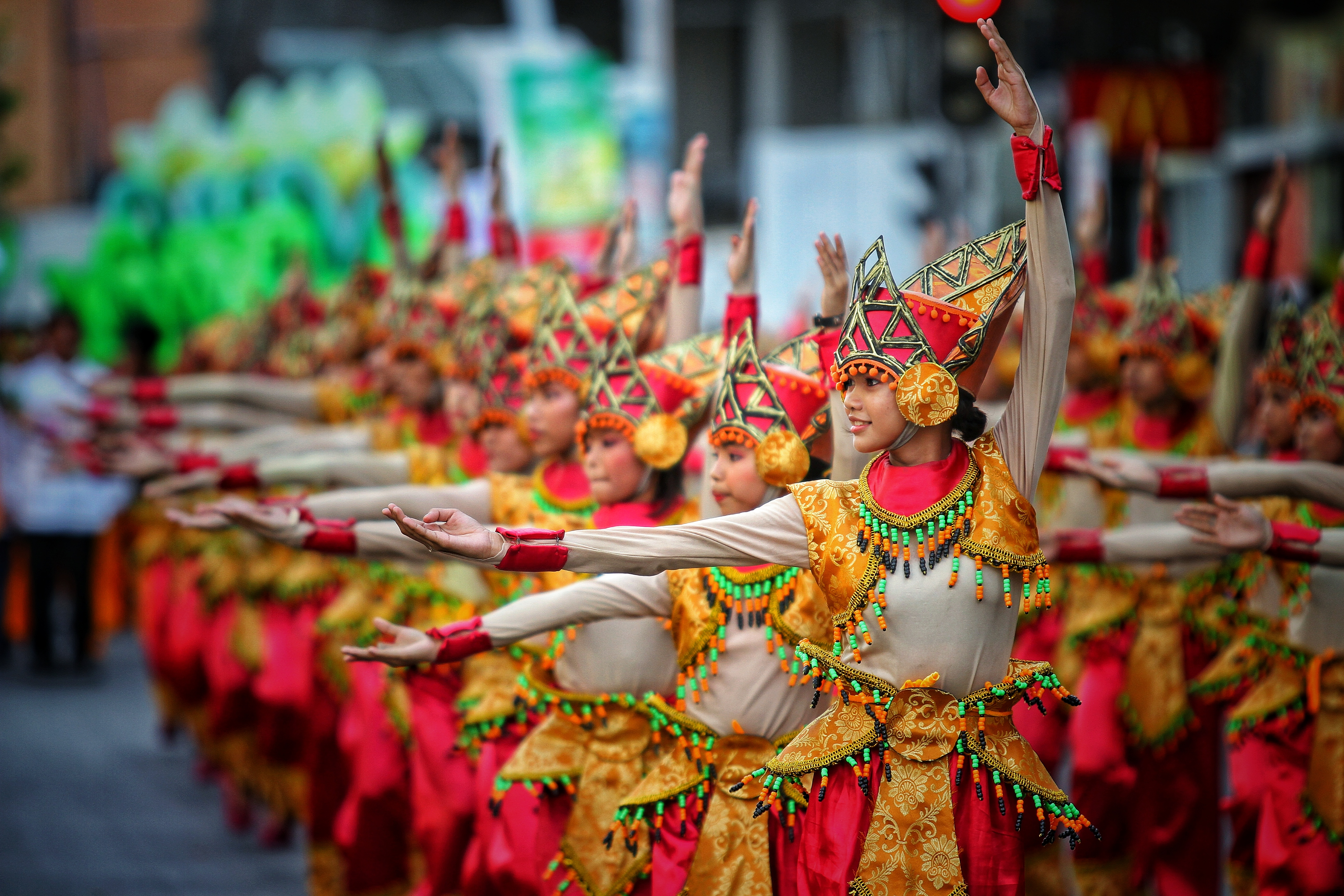
Saulog Festival in Tagbilaran City

== List of festivals ==
List of Bohol Festivals includes:
Name of festival	Date	Description
Abundayon Festival	Every Last Saturday of May	The Abundayon Festival is an annual cultural celebration in Talibon honoring the abundance of aquatic life and the blessings of the Santisima Trinidad. The Abundayon Festival is celebrated every Last Saturday of May in Talibon, Bohol, Philippines, as an expression of gratitude to the Santisima Trinidad (Most Holy Trinity) for the aquatic resources that sustain the community The name "Abundayon" comes from the word "abundance," symbolizing prosperity, rich cultural heritage, and the blessings enjoyed by the community. The festival features street dancing, cultural performances, music, and various activities that showcase the traditions, unity, and vibrant spirit of the people of Talibon. It is celebrated as part of the town's annual fiesta.
Agbunan	June 28	The culture and traditions of the people of San Isidro are displayed. The festival is a great means for the promotion of tourism, of ecological and agricultural pursuits, the enhancement of folk beliefs and of the natural environment. The festival comprises a street-dancing and a showdown. Showcases of organic farm products from the different barangays of the town are also displayed.
Bohol Fiestas	May	Much of fiestas are celebrated on the month of May.
Bolibongkingking Festival	May 23–24	For many years, Loboc has the music capital of the province. During this festival, local religious musical activities were exhibited where drums and gongs are played in various forms and rhythm.
Panagat Sa Dauis Festival	August 14	The Panagat Festival of Dauis is an annual celebration held on August 14, dedicated to honoring the Feast of the Immaculate Assumption, the patron saint of Dauis. This festival is a tribute to the patron saint's blessings and protection over the Dauisanon (Lawisnon) fishermen. The event features vibrant cultural performances, street dancing, and various activities that highlight the town's maritime heritage and the crucial role of fishing in the local community.
Calamay Festival	April 27–28	Jagna is Bohol's Calamay capital, which is also the province's most iconic pasalubong. Started in 2015, festival activities include Calamay demo cooking, preparation, and exhibition, free calamay tasting, parade of public utility vehicles with calamay-inspired decorations, kite flying contests, poem and folk dance contests, sports activities, and as well the most-anticipated Miss Jagna beauty pageant.
Enting-enting Festival	May 5	Pariticipants took turns in parade of dances and presentations all focusing on a miracles and works made by St. Vincent Ferrer in Maribojoc.
Hudyaka sa Panglao	August 28	The Hudyaka sa Panglao takes place on August 28 every year in the grounds of its parish church. The ten barangays of the municipality compete fiercely with each other to see which is the best of the best. Its own dance festival brings back ex-Panglao residents from all over the world, and instead of making a day of it, the music and dance lovers of Panglao try and make a whole week of it...and more. Actually, they take nine days and the whole town has a festive atmosphere with parties all over the place.
Kasadyaan sa Napo of Loon	First Sunday of February	Started almost 20 years ago as a way of veneration of and thanksgiving to the Holy Child, this festival is a prelude to the May 25 fiesta of the barangay. The main feature of Kasadyaan is a street dancing competition participated in by its five traditional household clusters, namely, Inang-angan, Kabaybayunan, Tulay, Wawog and Tubig-Loon. In recent years, the participants have been grouped by “purok”. After the street dancing, the participants perform a tableau, which is also part of the competition. A “sinulog” to the Santo Niño culminates the celebration.
Katigbawan	June 17–24	What distinguishes Catigbian from other towns is its annual festival, the Katigbawan. A week-long festival comprising various activities like carabao-racing, hog-catching, agrofair, motocross and a search for Miss Katigbawan. This affair happens only in June.
Pana-ad sa Loboc	Holy Thursday and Good Friday	A Holy Week procession.
Pandayan Festival	February 27	The Pandayan Festival is held at Barangay Lonoy, Jagna to celebrate the canonical erection or the parochial anniversary of St. Joseph the Worker Parish. All eight upland barangays of Jagna which is under the parochial jurisdiction of the Parish participates in the activities. Activities include a nine-day novena in honor of the patron saint, a procession of the image of St. Joseph the Worker, Carpentry and Handicrafts Fair, an inter - barangay basketball tournament and last but not least, the street dancing competition.
Sambat Mascara y Regatta Festival	first Saturday of December	Celebrated in honor of Loay's second patron, St. Francis Xavier, activities include agro-industrial fair, group masked street dancing, drum and bugle competition, boat racing, and fluvial parade along the river.
Sandugo Festival	July 1–31	This annual festival of the province commemorates the sandugo or blood compact between Datu Sikatuna and Miguel López de Legazpi.
Saulog Festival	May 1	Saulog which means “celebration.” It is a festival of thanksgiving in Tagbilaran City in honor their patron saint, St. Joseph the Worker.
SidlaKasilak or Festival of Lights of Loon	August 30 – September 8	This annual festival of lights honors the "Birhen sa Kasilak" (Our Lady of Light), patroness of Loon. It also expresses the enduring qualities of the town. The Visayan words "sidlak" (rise) and "silak" (shine) best describe the character of Loonanons as they conquer life's adversities and make the best out of their inherent talents and capabilities. The various sectors of the community mount sociocultural activities during the ten-day celebration which was started in 2000. Highlighting the festival is a fluvial procession followed by street dancing and dance of lights competitions. Other contests, all requiring the use of light, are also mounted. SidlaKasilak was inspired by past religious processions in Loon when the faithful would light candles in colorful hand-held lanterns or “parow”, the local version of the “parol”. In fact, during the first few years of the festival, the dancers brought traditional lanterns wrapped in Japanese paper. Candles, however, are no match to the wind made even stronger with every sway of the hands that held the lanterns. The Japanese paper, too, could not withstand too much heat nor could it resist the rain. Thus candles were later replaced with permanent yet adjustable lights like flashlights, magic sticks, light-emitting diodes and others. Glazed paper, plastic wrap and cloth have been used instead of Japanese paper. The distinctive nature of SidlaKasilak is manifested in its being the only evening street dancing event in Bohol. In addition, it does not require lavish costumes and props that onlookers do not appreciate in the dark. In fact, participating schools are required to use only their respective student uniforms. Community-based delegations choose their own attire. The contest criteria revolve solely on the lights and have remained the same for many years, to wit: lights design, color harmony and brightness (20%); choreography or movement and formation of lights (40%); and dynamics or manipulation and synchronization of the lights with the music (40%).
Sinugboan	May 27	Sinugboan Festival is celebrated every May 27 in the municipality of Garcia Hernandez. Sinugboan is a term closely related to the Cebuano word sugbo meaning to wallow. The use of the vernacular past tense "sinugbo" denotes an event of historical import. The festival highlights the town's annual commemoration of her foundation day. Activities include agro-industrial fair, recognition program for achievers, various games and street dancing competition where the storyline focuses on the creation and establishment of Garcia-Hernandez.
Sinu-og Estokada	September 21	The Sinu-og Estokada Festival is celebrated at the town of Jagna in honor of their patron saint, Saint Michael the Archangel where two groups, one coming from barangay Mayana and the other from Cabungaan, perform a native war dance during the vesper procession and also during the morning fluvial procession on the feast day itself which falls on September 29. This distinct cultural tradition has been observed for more than a century and shows the rich cultural heritage of the town. The native war dance is performed with the accompaniment of a drum depicting the battle between the early Jagnaanon Christians and the invading Muslims from Mindanao. The male dancers representing the Jagnaanons recite verses while mimicking the fight with bolos during the dance. The Sinu-og Estokada is a modification of the above sinu-og celebration. Here, the native war dance is portrayed as a fight between good and evil where the basic sequence of movements are modified conforming to a rhythm in marching and regular procedure. This festival is joined by the young adolescents of the town. It is believed that Saint Michael the Archangel rescued the people from the hands of the invaders at that time and this belief has been handed down to the present generation of Jagnaanons. Thus, Saint Michael the Archangel is much loved and revered by all Jagnaanons and the feast day is celebrated with much fanfare.
Suroy sa Musikero	December 25 – February 2	In Cebuano language, Suroy is means “walk” or “parade” while musikero means “musician.” It literally means “parade of musician” done by homegrown musicians which usually carry and play brass trombones, percussions, bass horns, clarinets, and trumpets as they play Christmas songs and carols in Loboc.
Tanda	May 6–15	The Tanda Festival is an annual festival held in May at the town of Tubigon, Bohol in honor of its patron saint, Sr. San Isidro Labrador. Tanda is a unique local Tubigon name which means "short visit". Tanda Festival highlights three major events namely; Bulong-Imang Streetdancing and Showdown, Anyag sa Tubigon Beauty Pageant, and Agro-Technological Fair. Bulong-Imang, derived from the rhythmic sound pattern of the drums and gong used in dancing, is a dance of praise and thanksgiving to Sr. San Isidro Labrador. It is held in Holy Cross Academy open field. The Anyag sa Tubigon, features the beauty and wit of Tubigon's pride ladies in a beauty pageant. And lastly, the Agro-Technological Fair is a display and exhibit of the bountiful harvest of the mountains, farmlands, and the shores of Tubigon set against the backdrop of trading and commerce. The Tanda festival highlights Tubigon's legacy: from the town's natural and historical treasures to its culture and history being celebrated in the unique Tubiganon way. The festival highlights the following:Bulong-Imang Streetdancing Competition, Anyag sa Tubigon, Agro-Technological Fair, Bangkarera, Sambunot sa Awit and, Lambay Jam.
Tigum Bol-anon sa Tibuok Kalibutan (TBTK)	July	Started in 1999, it is a yearly gathering of Boholanos worldwide initiated by Confederation of Boholanos in the United States of America and Canada (CONBUSAC)
Ubay-Ubay Festival	January 29	A series of street dancing parade and cultural presentations in honor of Sto. Niño held yearly during the town fiesta of Ubay.
Ubi Festival	Every second week of January.	Festival in celebration of the ubi tuber, a vegetable (Dioscorea alata). Ubi Festival showcases exhibits, crop competitions, agri-business investment opportunities seminars and cultural shows.

== List of Fiesta Dates ==
List of Bohol Fiesta Date:
City / Municipality	Date	Patron Saint
Alburquerque	May 4	Saint Monica
Alicia	July 26	Saint Joachim
Anda	Movable	Holy Infant
Antequera	Last Saturday of October	Our Lady of the Rosary
Baclayon	December 8	Our Lady of the Immaculate Conception
Balilihan	July 16	Our Lady of Mt. Carmel
Batuan	July 25	Saint James
Bien Unido	Movable	Holy Child Jesus
Bilar	May 15	Saint Isidore the Farmer
Buenavista	October 7	Our Lady of the Rosary
Calape	May 10	Saint Vincent Ferrer
Candijay	May 19	Saint Joseph
Carmen	January 17	Saint Anthony Abbot
Catigbian	December 8	Our Lady of the Immaculate Conception
Clarin	September 29	Saint Michael the Archangel
Corella	April 27	Our Lady of the Village
Cortes	January 16	Holy Infant
Dagohoy	February 11	Our Lady of Lourdes
Danao	December 30	Holy Family
Dauis	August 15	Our Lady of Assumption
Dimiao	September 10	Saint Nicholas of Tolentino
Duero	December 8	Our Lady of the Immaculate Conception
Garcia-Hernandez	June 24	Saint John the Baptist
Getafe	Last Saturday of January	Holy Infant
Guindulman	September 8	Our Lady of Consolation
Inabanga	June 30	Saint Paul the Apostle
Jagna	September 29	Saint Michael the Archangel
Lila	October 7	Our Lady of the Rosary
Loay	Movable	Holy Trinity
Loboc	June 29	Saint Peter the Apostle
Loon	September 8	Our Lady of Light
Mabini	May 4	Saint Monica
Maribojoc	May 5	Saint Vincent Ferrer
Panglao	August 28	Saint Augustine
Pilar	Third Sunday of October	Our Lady of the Pillar
Pres. Garcia	Third Friday of January	Holy Infant
Sagbayan	May 4/August 28	Saint Augustine
San Isidro	May 29	Saint Isidore the Farmer
San Miguel	May 8	Saint Michael the Archangel
Sevilla	December 12	Our Lady of Guadalupe
Sierra Bullones	December 8	Our Lady of the Immaculate Conception
Sikatuna	June 13	Saint Anthony de Padua
Tagbilaran City	May 1	Saint Joseph the Worker
Talibon	Last Saturday of May	Most Holy Trinity
Trinidad	May 15	Saint Isidore the Farmer
Tubigon	May 15	Saint Isidore the Farmer
Ubay	January 29	Holy Infant
Valencia	January 16	Holy Infant
