= Sandugo Festival =

Annual festival in Tagbilaran, Philippines

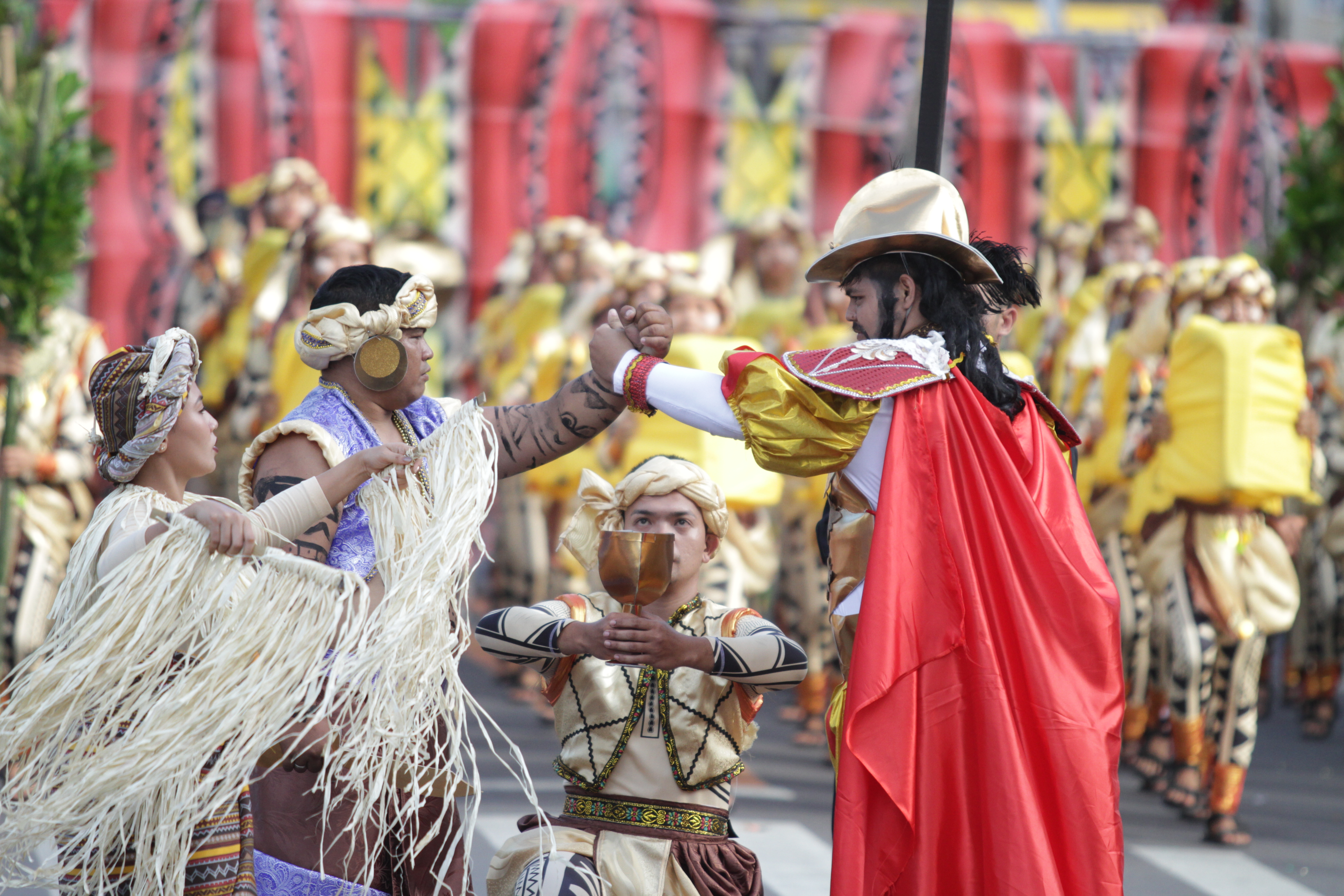
Sandugo Reenactment

The Sandugo Festival is an annual historical celebration that takes place every year in Tagbilaran City on the island of Bohol in the Philippines. This festival commemorates the Treaty of Friendship between Datu Sikatuna, a chieftain in Bohol, and Spanish conquistador Miguel López de Legazpi. This 16th-century peace treaty took place at Villalimpia, Hinawanan Bay, Loay on the Spanish boat San Pedro, March 25 1565, and is called a blood compact or "sandugo".

The Sandugo Festival is held every July. The Tagbilaran City Charter Day on July 1 kicks off the month-long festival with a holy mass, diana, motorcade and program sponsored by the City Government of Tagbilaran. Among the major activities during the month are the Miss Bohol Sandugo Beauty Pageant and the Sandugo Street Dancing Competition, which is usually held on the 3rd or 4th Sunday of July, and organized by the Bohol Sandugo Foundation.

== Sandugo Street Dancing Competition ==
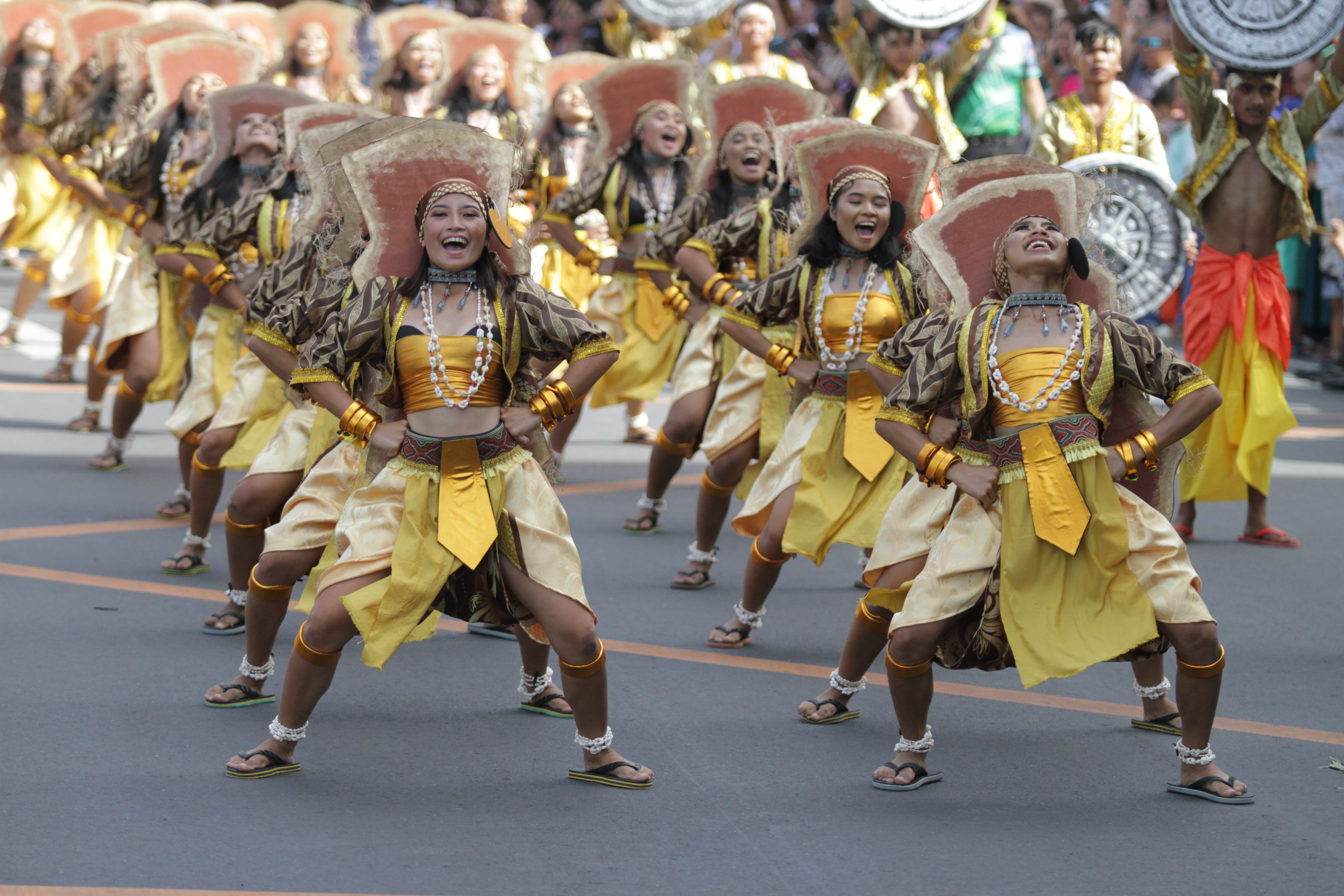
Sandugo Street Dancing

The competition attracts participants from schools, the city and municipal governments, Boholano organizations abroad, and contingents from other provinces. The competition starts at noon at the City Pier, passes through major streets, and culminates at the Pres. Carlos P. Garcia Sports Complex, where a Sandugo Re-enactment is held. The winners receive thousands of pesos in prizes.

As well as activities organized by the city and provincial governments and by the BSFI, there are nightly shows and a trade/food fair at the City Pier, a product showcase, concerts, medical and surgical missions.

=== Street Dancing Champions ===
Year	Champion
1989	Celestino Gallares Memorial Hospital
1991	Bohol National High School (BNHS) (Note: Now called Dr. Cecilio Putong National High School (DCPNHS))
1992	Bohol National High School (BNHS)
1993	Bohol National High School (BNHS) (Note: Sandugo Street Dancing Hall of Fame Awardee)
1995	Municipality of Baclayon
1996	Municipality of Talibon
1997	Bohol School of Arts and Trades (BSAT) (Note: Now called Bohol Island State University (BISU), formerly Central Visayas State College of Agriculture, Forestry & Technology (CVSCAFT))
1998	Municipality of Panglao
1999	Municipality of Panglao
2000	Overall Champion, Theme Category: Municipality of Loon; Best in Street Dancing: Municipality of Loon; Best in Production Design: Municipality of Loon; Best in Musical Accompaniment: Municipality of Carmen; Winner, Open Category: San Roque, Sogod (Southern Leyte)
2001	Municipality of Panglao
2002	Municipality of Panglao
2003	Municipality of Panglao
2004	Bohol Island State University
2008	Best in Street Dancing: Municipality of Jagna; Best in Field Performance: Municipality of Maribojoc; Best in Production Design: Pamilacan Island Tourism Livelihood and Multi-Purpose Cooperative, Pamilacan Island, Baclayon
2009	Bohol Island State University
2010	Bohol Island State University
2011	Municipality of Carmen
2012	Bohol Island State University (BISU) Candijay Campus
2013	Bohol Island State University (BISU) Clarin Campus
2014	Bohol Island State University (BISU) Calape Campus
2015	Bohol Island State University (BISU) Bilar Campus
2016	Barangay Napo, Loon
2017	Barangay Napo, Loon
2018	Barangay Napo, Loon
2019	Catigbian National High School (CNHS)
2023	City of Tagbilaran
2024	City of Tagbilaran
2025	Bolibongkingking Festival (Municipality of Loboc)
2026	Katigbawan Festival (Municipality of Catigbian)

There were no competitions from 2005-2007. In 2005 and 2006, Champions from around the country like Masskara, Ati-atihan, etc., performed. In 2007, 30 local contingents participated in an exhibition performance. Due to the COVID-19 Pandemic, there were no competitions from 2020-2022.

== The Bohol Sandugo Foundation, Inc. ==
Due to the inadequate support coming from both government and private sectors coupled with the dwindling public interest in the yearly celebration of the Sandugo Festival, the Bohol Sandugo Foundation, Inc. (BSFI) was organized in 1991. Since then, the BSFI has ably spearheaded the celebration of the Sandugo and has made significant efforts in reviving a nationwide interest in the event which has now become a magnetic byword in the tourism industry.

== Tigum Bol-anon Sa Tibuok Kalibutan ==
Every two years, the "Tigum Bol-anon Sa Tibuok Kalibutan" (English: A Gathering of Boholanos Around the World) or TBTK is held in unison with the Sandugo Festival. This gathering is organized by the Confederation of Boholanos in the US and Canada or CONBUSAC, which aims to gather Boholanos from all over for a celebration of unity. Among the activities conducted by the TBTK is the Search for Mrs. Bohol International and Miss Bohol International, CONBUSAC Convention, Awarding of Outstanding Boholanos, medical and surgical missions (in cooperation with the BSFI), and others.

== The 2010 Sandugo Festival ==
The 2010 theme is "Sandugo at 22: Onward for Unity and Progress". The schedule of events are as follows:

- July 1 – Tagbilaran City's 44th Charter Anniversary at the City Hall Atrium
- July 1–31 - Trade/Food Fair at the City Pier
- July 16 - Miss Bohol Sandugo Pageant & Coronation Night at the Bohol Cultural Center
- July 21–25 - DTI Sandugo Product Showcase at the Block, Island City Mall
- July 22 - 156th Bohol Day Celebration at the Bohol Cultural Center
- July 25 - Sandugo Street Dancing, City Pier to CPG Sports Complex
