= Dapitan Kingdom =

Pre-colonial Southeast Asian polity

Dapitan Kingdom (Bool Kingdom) Dapitan
- unknown–1595
- Capital: Centered in modern Tagbilaran Strait, and Panglao Island (unknown–1563); Dapitan (1563–1595)
- Official languages: Bol-anon, Eskayan, Old Malay
- Religion: Hinduism, Islam and Animism, later Christianity
- Government: Monarchy
- History
  - Founding of the polity: unknown
  - Area attacked by Sultanate of Ternate: 1563
  - Datu Sikatuna made a blood compact with Miguel Lopez de Legazpi: March 25, 1565
  - Datu Sigala made a blood compact with Miguel Lopez de Legazpi: March 28, 1565
  - Datu Sikatuna and his wife, Albasea converted to Christianity: July 16, 1597
  - Fall of Ternate and Moluccas: April 1, 1606
  - Dapitan and Bohol became protectorate of Spain: 1595
- Currency: Barter
Succeeded by
Captaincy General of the Philippines; Cebu

Dapitan Kingdom (also called Bool Kingdom) is the term used by local historians of Bohol, Philippines, to refer to the Dauis–Mansasa polity in the modern city of Tagbilaran and the adjacent island of Panglao. The volume of artifacts unearthed in the sites of Dauis and Mansasa may have inspired the creation of the legend of the "Dapitan Kingdom" through piecing together the oral legends of the Eskaya people and historical events such as the Ternatean raid of Bohol and the migration of Boholanos under Datu Pagbuaya to Dapitan.

== History ==
=== Early history ===
In the early 17th century, Father Ignacio Alcina recorded that a certain Datung Sumanga of Leyte wooed the princess Bugbung Humasanum, of Bohol, and married her after raiding Imperial China and afterwards were the precursors of the people there.

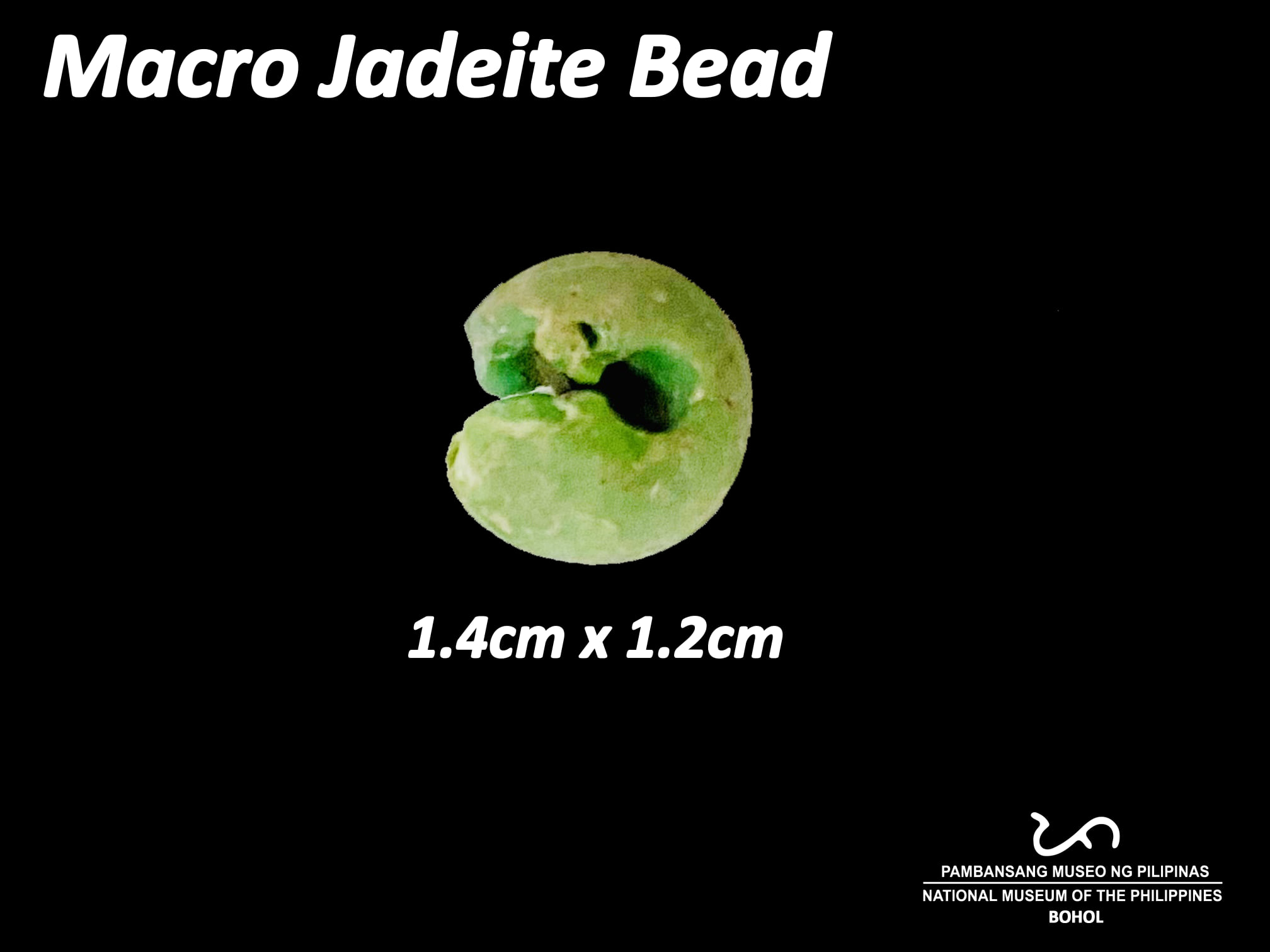
A jade bead uncovered from the vicinity of the Dapitan Polity of Bohol. Jade carving requires advanced industry in ancient times as jade is harder than steel.

In 1667, Father Francisco Combes, in his Historia de Mindanao, mentioned that the people of the island of Panglao had once invaded mainland Bohol, subsequently imposing their economic and political dominance in the area. They considered the previous inhabitants of the islands their slaves by reason of war, as witnessed, for example, by how Datu Pagbuaya, one of the rulers of Panglao, considered Datu Sikatuna his vassal and relative. The invasion of mainland Bohol by the people of Panglao ushered in the birth of the so-called Bohol "kingdom", also known as the "Dapitan Kingdom of Bohol". The Bohol "kingdom" prospered under the reign of the two brother rulers of Panglao, Datu Dailisan and Datu Pagbuaya, with trade links established with neighboring Southeast Asian countries, particularly with the Sultanate of Ternate. Alcina referred to it as the "Venice of the Visayas" since it was a maritime focused Kedatuan with flourishing canals and was composed of 10,000 stilt buildings in the water. The flourishing of trade in the Bohol "kingdom" is owed to its strategic location along the busy trading channels of Cebu and Butuan. For other countries such as Ternate to gain access to the busy trade ports of the Visayas, they need to first forge diplomatic ties with the Bohol "kingdom".

Relations between the Sultanate of Ternate in the Moluccas, and Bohol, soured when the Ternatan sultan learned of the sad fate of his emissary and his men, who were executed by the two ruling chieftains of Bohol as punishment for abusing one of the concubines. For revenge, Ternate sent twenty joangas disguised as friendly traders with the aide of Portuguese artillery and some men to attack Bohol. Caught unaware, the inhabitants of Bohol could not defend themselves against the Ternatan raiders, who were also equipped with sophisticated firearms like muskets and arquebuses, which the Boholanos saw for the first time. Many Boholanos lost their lives in this conflict, including Dailisan. After the raid, Pagbuaya, who was left as the sole reigning chief of the island, decided to abandon Bohol together with the rest of the freemen as they considered Bohol island unfortunate and accursed. They settled on the northern coast of the island of Mindanao, where they established the Dapitan settlement.

=== Spanish colonial period ===
The Kingdom of Dapitan had been integral to the spread of Spanish conquest and control in the Philippines. The conquest of the Philippines would have been impossible without the allegiance and help of several hundred Bisaya warriors, including Boholanos who have a common hatred with the Spaniards against Muslims; with Bohol being once destroyed by the Ternate Sultanate while Spain was once invaded by the Umayyad Caliphate.

Don Pedro Manuel Manooc, known for his military and navigation skills, aided the Spaniards in their invasion of Manila on May 24, 1570, and Bicol (started from Camarines) in July 1573. In 1667, chronicler Fr. Francisco Combés, S.J, described Manooc in Spanish as "Fiero, hombre que facilmente se embravece", which means "the one who gets easily heated like iron".

For some time, during the conquest of Bicol, Manooc, together with his kinsmen, founded and settled in the villages of Bacon, Bulusan, Gubat, and Magallanes, protecting these coastal settlements from barbaric Moro pirates and paving the way for evangelical missions of the Franciscans. Nearly two hundred years later, on June 13, 1764, Manooc's great-grandson, Don Pedro Manook, became the first gobernadorcillo of Gubat when it became an independent town.

Manooc also supported Spanish campaigns in Cebu, Mindanao, Caraga, and Jolo. On one recorded event, Manooc defeated the Sultan of Jolo, escaping as a fugitive, who had a fleet of 12 joangas and eventually captured the flagship. In 1595, Manooc reached Lanao, defeating the Maranaos, who were then under the protection of the Sultanate of Maguindanao, eventually capturing the island settlement of Bayug, a sitio in the present-day barangay of Hinaplanon, and founding Iligan as one of the earliest Christian settlements in the country.

Captain Laria, a cousin of Manooc, served Spain in the conquest of the Moluccas in 1606.

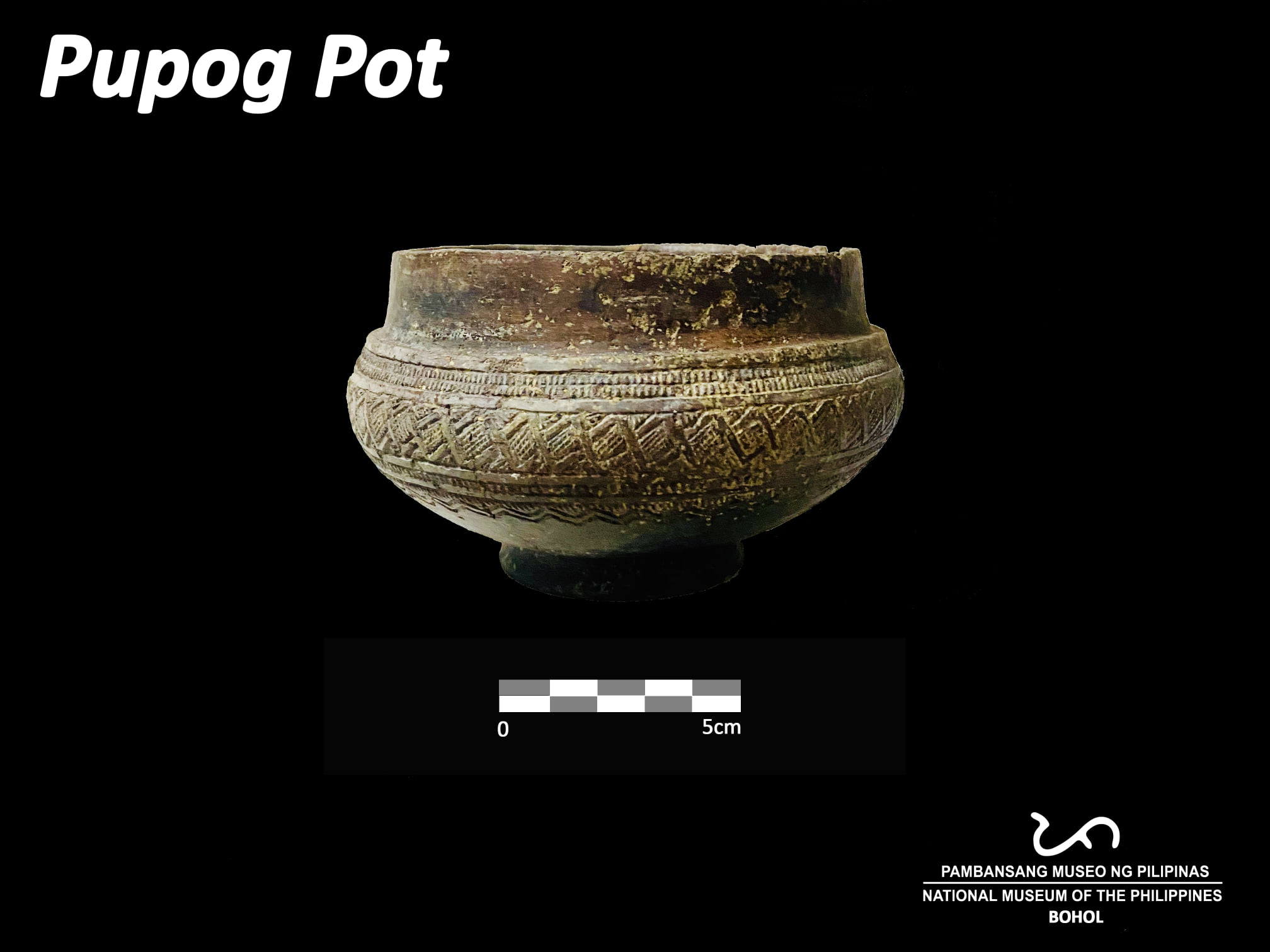
Indigenous Pugpog Pottery from the Dapitan Polity of Bohol

Manooc's sister, Doña Madalena Baluyot (or Bacuya), was known to be a pacifier and peacemaker for varying factions of Subanon tribe, which earned respect from its chiefs. In 1596, Doña Baluyot mediated between locals and missionaries, supporting Jesuit missions in Eastern Mindanao, and eventually converting Datu Silongan (baptized Felipe Silongan), ruler of Butuan, which further led to the evangelization of Caraga and Davao Oriental.

Manooc's daughter, Doña Maria Uray, later married warrior Gonzalo Maglinti. Manooc died, and his remains were buried in front of the main altar of the Cebu Metropolitan Cathedral, a distinguished honor given for supporting the Spanish empire. After his death, son-in-law Maglinti and grandson Pedro Cabili (or Cabilin) continued to defend Christian settlements against Maranao and Maguindanao fleets from Sirawai, Zamboanga, towards the ends of Iligan and Panguil Bay. Maglinti was also known for watching over the islands and dispatching information to established settlements in Cebu and Iloilo amid threats from Moro pirates.

Pedro Cabili was as young as 7 years old when he joined his father Maglinti in the conquest and was also known as a fierce warrior perfectly skilled in hand-to-hand combat. In the 18th and 19th centuries, the family dominated politics in Dapitan and Iligan. During this time, the Spanish used Dapitan as a military outpost for their operations against the Moros. Spain constructed a number of forts along the north-western coast, in Dapitan, Iligan, and Ozamis, supported by the Cabili family. Eventually, Cabili became the ancestor of future assemblyman, senator, and defense secretary Tomas Cabili, Iligan gobernadorcillo Remigio Cabili, and mayors Brod and Camilo Cabili. Camilo Cabili also became a congressman for Iligan from 1984 to 1986 during the Regular Batasang Pambansa.

In 1622, Datu Salangsang, Baluyot's grandson and ruler of present-day Cagayan de Oro and Misamis Oriental, through her intervention, allowed Augustinian Recollect missions to the province. Salangsang's seat of government was in Huluga, at the present-day sitio Taguanao in the southern barangay of Indahag, but he later transferred to and founded the present-day Cagayan de Oro upon the recommendation of Fr. Agustin de San Pedro (also known as El Padre Capitan) in 1627, securing the settlement amid threats from Maranaos and Sultan Kudarat.
