= Blood brother =

Male not related by birth who has sworn loyalty

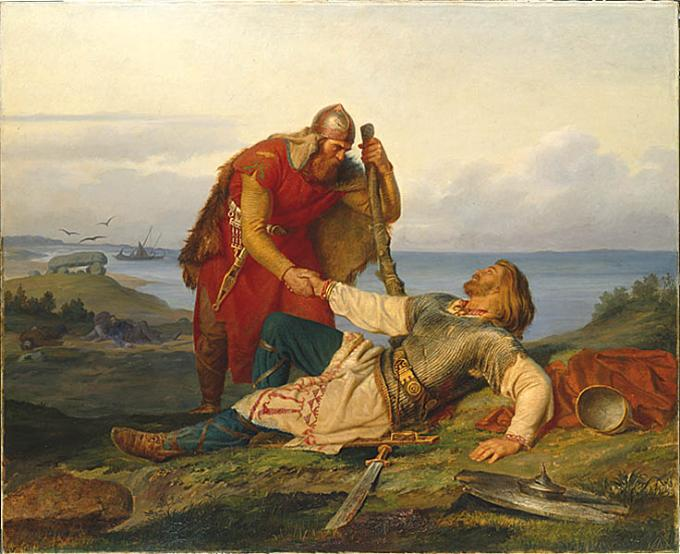
The Norwegian warrior Örvar-Oddr bids a last farewell to his blood brother, the Swedish warrior Hjalmar, by Mårten Eskil Winge (1866).

Blood brother can refer to two or more people not related by birth who have sworn loyalty to each other. This is in modern times usually done in a ceremony, known as a blood oath, where each person makes a small cut, usually on a finger, hand, or the forearm, and then the two cuts are pressed together and bound, the symbolism being that each person's blood now flows in the other participant's veins.

== Cultures ==
=== Germanic ===
The Norsemen entering the pact of foster brotherhood (Icelandic: Fóstbræðralag) involved a rite in which they let their blood flow while they ducked underneath an arch formed by a strip of turf propped up by a spear or spears. An example is described in Gísla saga. In Fóstbræðra saga, the bond of Thorgeir Havarsson (Þorgeir Hávarsson) and Thormod Bersason (Þormóð Bersason) is sealed by such ritual as well, the ritual being called a leikr.

Örvar-Oddr's saga contains another notable account of blood brotherhood. Örvar-Oddr, after fighting the renowned Swedish warrior Hjalmar to a draw, entered a foster brotherhood with him by the turf-raising ritual. Afterwards, the strand of turf was put back during oaths and incantations.

In the mythology of Northern Europe, Gunther and Högni became the blood brothers of Sigurd when he married their sister Gudrun. In Wagner's opera Götterdämmerung, the concluding part of his Ring Cycle, the same occurs between Gunther and Wagner's version of Sigurd, Siegfried, which is marked by the "Blood Brotherhood Leitmotiv". Additionally, it is briefly stated in Lokasenna that Odin and Loki are blood brothers.

=== Scythia ===
Among the Scythians, the covenantors would allow their blood to drip into a cup; the blood was subsequently mixed with wine and drunk by both participants. Every man was limited to having three blood brotherhoods at any time lest his loyalties be distrusted. As a consequence, blood brotherhood was highly sought after and often preceded by a lengthy period of affiliation and friendship (Lucian, Toxaris). The 4th-century BC depictions of two Scythian warriors drinking from a single drinking horn (most notably in a gold appliqué from Kul-Oba) have been associated with the Scythian oath of blood brotherhood.

The Hungarian hajduks had a similar ceremony, but the wine was often replaced with milk so that the blood would be more visible.

=== East Asia ===
In Asian cultures, the act and the ceremony of becoming blood brothers is generally seen as a tribal relationship for bringing about alliance between tribes. It was practiced for that reason most notably by the Mongols, Turkic and Chinese.

In Romance of the Three Kingdoms, the Chinese classical literature, the three main characters took an oath of blood brother, the Oath of the Peach Garden, by sacrificing a black ox and a white horse and by swearing faith. Other blood oaths involving animal sacrifice were characteristic of rebel groups, such as the uprising led by Deng Maoqi in the 1440s, of criminal organizations, such as the triads or the pirates of Lin Daoqian, and other East Asians such as the Mongols and the Manchu. Genghis Khan had an anda called Jamukha. The term also exist in Old Turkic: ant ičmek ("to take an oath"), derived from the "ancient test by poison". The Turkic term, if it is not a loanword in Middle Mongol, is related to Mongol anda.

=== Philippines ===
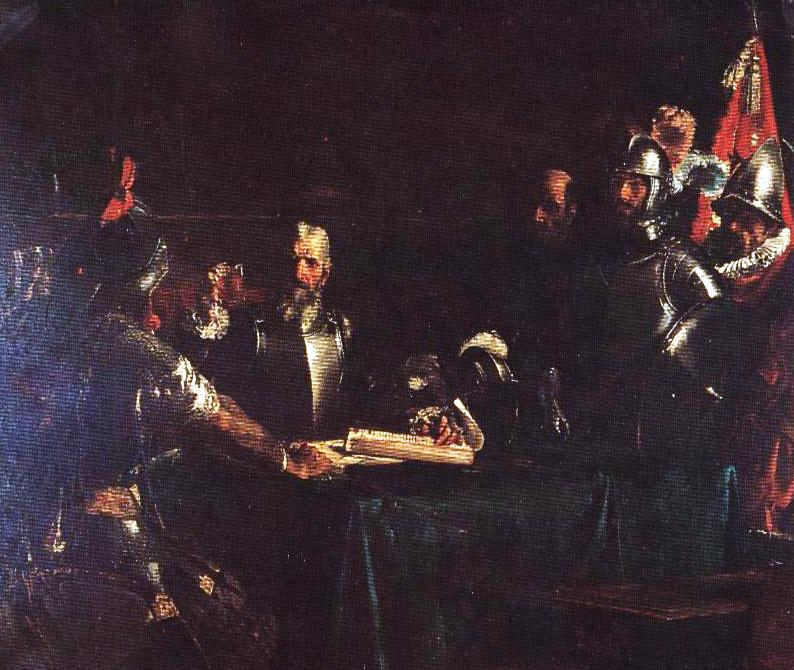
The Blood Compact, a romanticized painting of the Sandugo blood compact ritual between the Spanish explorer Miguel López de Legazpi and Datu Sikatuna of Bohol, Philippines; by Juan Luna (1886)

In the Philippines, blood compacts (sandugo or sanduguan, literally "one blood") were ancient rituals that were intended to seal a friendship or treaty or to validate an agreement. They were described in the records of the early Spanish and Portuguese explorers to the islands. The most well-known version of the ritual from the Visayan people involves mixing a drop of blood from both parties into a single cup of wine that is then drunk. Other versions also exist, like in Palawan which describes a ritual involving making a cut on the chest and then daubing the blood on the tongue and forehead.

=== Sub-Saharan Africa ===
The blood oath was used in much the same fashion as has already been described in much of Sub-Saharan Africa. The British colonial administrator Lord Lugard is famous for having become blood brothers with numerous African chiefs as part of his political policy in Africa. A powerful blood brother was the Kikuyu chieftain Waiyaki Wa Hinga. David Livingstone wrote of a similar practice called 'Kasendi'.

=== Eastern Europe ===
Blood brothers among larger groups were common in ancient Eastern Europe, where, for example, whole companies of soldiers would become one family through the ceremony. It was perhaps most prevalent in the Balkans during the Ottoman era, as it helped the oppressed people to fight the enemy more effectively. Blood brotherhoods were common in what is today Albania, Bosnia and Herzegovina, Bulgaria, Croatia, Greece, Montenegro, Serbia, North Macedonia, Poland, Russia, Ukraine, Slovakia, and Czech Republic. Christianity also recognized sworn brotherhood in a ceremony, which was known as Greek: adelphopoiesis, Slavic languages: pobratimstvo in the Eastern Orthodox Churches and as Latin: ordo ad fratres faciendum in the Catholic Church. The tradition of intertwining arms and drinking wine is also believed to be a representation of becoming blood brothers.

== Famous blood brothers ==
=== Historical ===
- In the 9th century AD, chiefs of the seven Hungarian tribes formed an alliance drinking from each other's blood, and chose Álmos as leader.
- In 1066, Robert d'Ouilly and Roger d'Ivry, two Norman knights taking part in the Norman Conquest of England were known as blood brothers. It was said they had agreed beforehand to share profits of this adventure. Both survived the Battle of Hastings, were granted lands in Oxfordshire and elsewhere, then worked together on various projects such as Wallingford Castle.
- In the 12th century AD, the Mongol leaders Yesükhei (father of Temüjin) and Toghrul (later ally of Temüjin) were blood brothers.
- Temüjin (Genghis Khan) and Jamukha were childhood friends and blood brothers, although Jamukha later betrayed Temüjin. Jamukha refused reconciliation and thus was executed at the orders of Temüjin.
- In the 18th century AD, emissaries of British King George III and leaders of the Jamaican Maroons reportedly drank each other's blood when conducting peace treaties.
- Blood brothers in the Serbian Revolution (1804–17): rebel leader Karađorđe (1762–1817) and commander Milutin Savić (1762–1842); Karađorđe and Greek volunteer Giorgakis Olympios (1772–1821); commander Hajduk-Veljko (1780–1813) and Giorgakis Olympios; commanders Stojan Čupić (1765–1815) and Bakal-Milosav; commanders Cincar-Janko (1779–1833), Miloš Stojićević Pocerac (1776–1811) and Anta Bogićević (1758–1813).
- Blood brothers in the later Principality of Serbia: Prince Milan Obrenović (1854–1901) and Milan Piroćanac (1837–1897); Aćim Čumić (1836–1901) and Kosta Protić (1831–1892); Đura Jakšić (1832–1878) and Stevan Vladislav Kaćanski (1829–1890).
- In the Greek War of Independence (1821–30), Greek Nikolaos Kriezotis and Montenegrin Vaso Brajević were said to be blood brothers.
- Samoan wrestler "High Chief" Peter Maivia was a blood brother of Amituanai Anoaʻi, father of fellow wrestlers Afa and Sika Anoaʻi, renown as the Wild Samoans, who regard Peter as their uncle. Thus, from that time onwards, the Anoaʻi family regard the Maivia line as an extension of their own clan.

=== Folklore ===
- The Norse gods Loki and Odin are famously stated to have mixed blood in days of old in Lokasenna. This has been taken as an explanation why Loki is at all tolerated by the gods.
- Liu Bei, Guan Yu and Zhang Fei. In the historical novel Romance of the Three Kingdoms by Luo Guanzhong, these three men swore in their famous Oath of the Peach Garden that despite not being born on the same day, their sworn brotherhood would end with them dying on the same day. Histories only mention that the three men were "close like brothers".
- In the Chinese tale Journey to the West, Sun Wukong (the Monkey King) became blood brothers with Niu Mowang (the Bull Demon King) and several other demon leaders, but later on this brother relationship was forgotten because of a conflict that occurred involving the bull demon's son that caused other problems for Wukong. Wukong also mentions being sworn brothers with Erlang Shen. Erlang has six other sworn brothers from Plum Hill.
- In Serbian epic poetry, there are several blood brotherhoods. Miloš Obilić with Milan Toplica and Ivan Kosančić, Miloš Obilić with Prince Marko, Miloš Obilić with the Jugović brothers, Despot Vuk Grgurević and Dmitar Jakšić.

=== Literature ===
- Winnetou and Old Shatterhand in works of Karl May.
- The characters Edward Lyons and Mickey Johnstone in Willy Russell's Blood Brothers.
