= List of caves in Misamis Oriental =

Misamis Oriental can be found in Northern Mindanao, Philippines. It is divided into twenty-three municipalities and two main cities. Its capital, Cagayan de Oro, is an urbanized location and independently governs itself from Misamis Oriental.

Different parts of Misamis Oriental are endowed with archaeological questions that remain unanswered until today. This includes the five caves namely: Amboy Cave, Liyang Cave, Salvan Cave, Huluga Cave, and Tagbalitang Cave.

Different artifacts and archaeological remains were found inside these caves. These could help fill in the gaps of the chronology of past life in the province of Misamis Oriental once dat

== Amboy Cave ==
The Amboy Cave is located in barangay Dansolihon in Cagayan de Oro. Its mouth is around 4 meters high and 3 meters wide. Human remains and artefacts such as earthenware and porcelain shards and metal fragments were discovered inside the cave. The cave is currently owned by Pelik Bongtong.

== Liyang Cave ==
The Liyang Cave was discovered in Sitio Nilintian in El Salvador. The property where the cave site is located is owned by Jake Abesamis. Earthenware shards and possibly hammer stones were found inside the cave. The mouth of the Liyang Cave is 1.2 meters high and 6 meters wide.

== Salvan Cave ==
The Salvan Caves is located in Barangay Bacogboc. No archaeological materials were found inside the cave except for a stone mortar found near the mouth.

== Huluga Cave ==
The Huluga area, where the cave is located, is over 80 feet high with a surrounding area of 40 meters from the western to eastern part of the cave and 50 meters from south to north. The northern and southern borders are covered with cogon grass and huge Balete trees. The Huluga Cave is located about 8 kilometers south of the city poblacion of Cagayan de Oro, in the sitio of Taguanao. It is composed of two main caverns, situated on the Cagayan de Oro River along the brow of a vertical limestone cliff.

Fr. Francisco Demetrio, SJ published in 1971 an article entitled “The Huluga Caves and the Prehistory of Cagayan”, which presents the practice of burial in the caves before the 17th century. He also stated that the Huluga cave site contains evidence of recurring human presence from the late Neolithic period until the Sung and Ming dynasties.

In the 1970s, authorities from the Philippine National Museum, led by Historical Commission member Erlinda Burton, went to Cagayan de Oro to research on the prehistoric fossils and artifacts found near the Cagayan River. The report about the fossils and artifacts was proven to be true. The skeletal fragments which have been found inside the cave were believed to be that of a woman and a child who inhabited the place during prehistoric times. The incomplete remains of a woman was found in a niche of the cave, along with associated material cultures which consisted of obsidian flakes and chips, chert flakes, pot shards, and some porcelain shards. The skeletal fragments were dated 377 A.D. based on the acid racemization done by the Scripps Institution of Oceanography in La Jolla, California, US.

According to the Heritage Conservation Advocates, it is "the home of the original native people of Cagayan de Oro". The cave is considered by many people, to be a sacred site which lacks protection and guidance by the government. Inside, they have found native tools such as glass beads, spoons, pendants, bracelets, stone tools, axe tips, and pieces of iron.

However, Dr. Victor Paz, director of the Archaeological Studies Program of the University of the Philippines, said that as of 2004, they have not found evidence to prove that the Huluga cave site is indeed a settlement site. There were excavations and explorations conducted in the Huluga site and Paleolithic stones in Mindanao were recovered. The explorations were done to help the local government of Cagayan de Oro establish a local museum in the city.

Today, both caves at Huluga have been left in their primordial conditions. Each cave is marked with a Philippine National Museum code number. The first cave is marked with the code “NM X-91-R2” while the Open Site is code numbered “X-91-Q2”. On the other hand, many artefacts can be found in the Museo de Oro of Xavier University and the archaeological records division of the National Museum in Manila continue to keep the records of the site.

== Tagbalitang Cave ==
The Tagbalitang Cave in the municipality of Villanueva has produced several Neolithic finds by previous researchers (Cabanilla 1970; Peralta 1968).

== Conclusion ==
Several remains found in the different caves found in Misamis Oriental gave various archaeological dates. Liyang Cave and Huluga Cave presented a relatively early time period dating from the Paleolithic to the Metal Age. The limestone formation is composed of Pliocene and Pleistocene sediments of both marine and terrestrial depositions (DENR 1999; Sajona et al. 2000:175). Huluga cave is by far oldest of all the archaeological sites in terms of archaeological evidence and presented artefacts which were dated to be from the Neolithic period.

The materials in Amboy Cave were dated to be from the early 15th to 17th centuries CE. The date of the found human remains remain unidentified. The cave, unfortunately, is exploited by many treasure hunters and guano collectors. Salvan Cave needs further investigation regarding its archaeological remains.

All of the caves are profound repositories of artifacts and many other remains that could fill in the gaps of Philippine archaeology that is why they should be protected. The people in Misamis Oriental should feel the responsibility of preventing hunters to loot inside the caves to preserve everything that is found inside the caves. Lastly, further investigation may be conducted in order to improve the present knowledge about the history of Misamis Oriental.

== See also ==
- List of caves
