= Napoleon Abueva =

Filipino sculptor (1930–2018)

Napoleon Galamiton Abueva
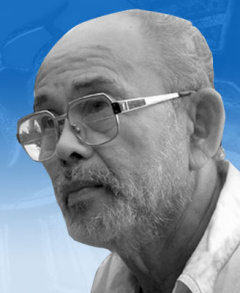
- Napoleon Abueva from the Order of National Artists (NCCA)
- Born: Esabelio Veloso Abueva; January 26, 1930; Tagbilaran, Bohol, Philippine Islands
- Died: February 16, 2018 (aged 88); Quezon City, Philippines
- Resting place: Libingan ng mga Bayani
- Occupation: Sculptor
- Spouse: Sergia Valles Abueva
- Children: 3
- Awards: Order of National Artists of the Philippines

Napoleon "Billy" Veloso Abueva (January 26, 1930 – February 16, 2018) was known as the "Father of Modern Philippine Sculpture" Through Proclamation No. 1539. He was proclaimed National Artist for Sculpture in 1976 when he was 46, making him the youngest recipient of the award to date.

== Biography and career ==
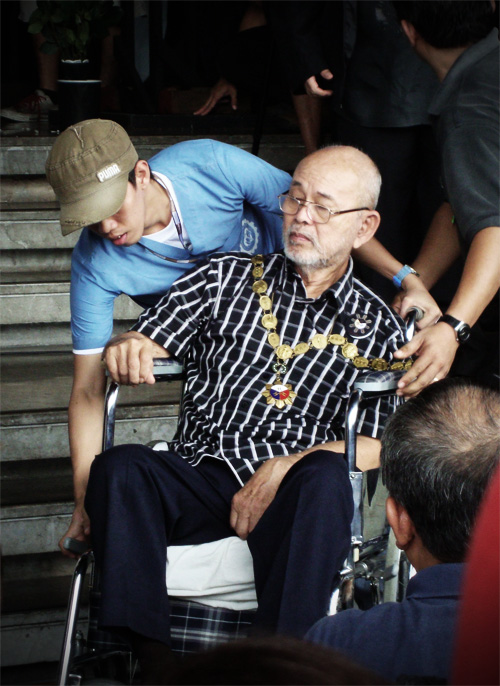
Abueva attending the National Artist award protest on August 7, 2009

Billy Abueva, as he was fondly called, was born in Tagbilaran, Bohol, to Teodoro Lloren Abueva, born in Duero, Bohol, a Bohol congressman and Purificación González Veloso, born in Cebu, president of the Women's Auxiliary Service. Abueva had six other brothers and sisters: Teodoro Jr., Purificacion, José, Amelia Martinez, Teresita Floro, and Antonio. Born Esabelio Veloso Abueva, he was named after the younger sister of his paternal grandmother, Isabel.

He assumed the name Napoleon at the age of six, when as a student at the St. Joseph Academy in Tagbilaran, one of the nuns first called him Napoleon after Napoleon Bonaparte. The name stuck, and ever since, Abueva referenced the quote from Napoleon: "If I weren't a conqueror, I would wish to be a sculptor."

Abueva graduated in high school at the Rafael Palma College (now the University of Bohol) in 1949. He earned his Bachelor of Fine Arts in Sculpture at the UP School of Fine Arts (now UP College of Fine Arts/UPCFA) in 1953 as one of the second batch of Fine Arts students who moved from the old campus in Padre Faura to Diliman. He was mentored by fellow National Artist for Sculpture Guillermo Tolentino.

Through scholarship grants, he was able to pursue advanced studies abroad including one from Harvard University.

== Major works ==
Recognized as the "Father of Modern Philippine Sculpture", Abueva helped shape the local sculpture scene to what it is now. He used almost all kinds of materials for his sculptures such as hard wood, adobe, metal, stainless steel, cement, marble, bronze, iron, alabaster, coral and brass. He was the first Filipino artist to mount a one-man exhibit at the Philippine Center in New York in 1980. Most of his bronze works were cast by Franz Herbich, a German Filipino artist based in Cebu Philippines.

Some of his major works include Kaganapan (1953), Kiss of Judas (1955), Thirty Pieces of Silver, The Transfiguration (1979), Eternal Garden Memorial Park, UP Gateway (1967), Nine Muses (1994), UP Faculty Center, Sunburst (1994)-Peninsula Manila Hotel, the bronze figure of Teodoro M. Kalaw in front of National Library, and murals in marble at the National Heroes Shrine, Mt. Samat, Bataan.

- Kaganapan (1953)
- Kiss of Judas (1955)
- UP Gateway (1967)
- Thirty Pieces of Silver
- The Transfiguration (Eternal Gardens Memorial Park) (1979)
- Sandugo (Blood Compact)
- Mini-Waterfalls (Legaspi Towers 300) (~1980)
- The Fredesvinda (Fort Canning Park – Singapore) (1982)
- Siyam na Diwata ng Sining (Nine Muses) (1994)
- UP Faculty Center
- Sunburst (The Peninsula Manila Hotel) (1994)

His Sandugo or Blood Compact shrine in Barangay Bool, Tagbilaran City is a landmark at the site of the first international treaty of friendship between Spaniards and Filipinos.

His son, Mulawin Abueva, performed the death mask procedure of opposition leader Ninoy Aquino in 1983 while the elder Abueva made the death mask of Fernando Poe, Jr. in 2004. Both masks are now displayed at the Center for Kapampangan Studies, Holy Angel University, in Angeles Pampanga. He also made a death mask of Cardinal Sin.

== Family ==
He was married to Cherry Abueva, a psychiatrist, and had three children: Amihan, Mulawin, and Duero. Before his stroke, he taught at the Industrial Design department of the De La Salle-College of Saint Benilde School of Design and Arts.

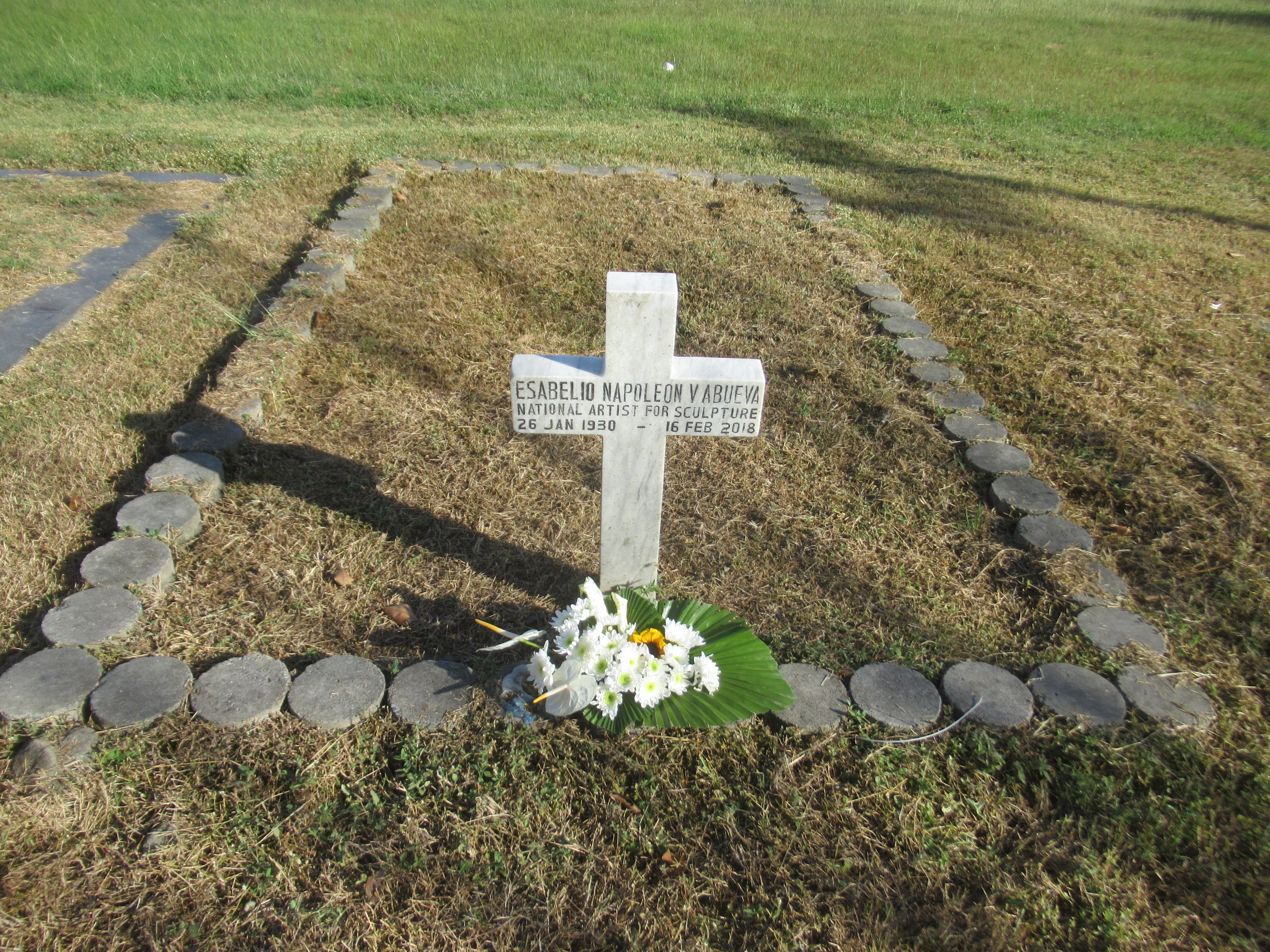
Abueva's grave at the Libingan ng mga Bayani.

Abueva was confined at the National Kidney and Transplant Institute in Quezon City for pneumonia from December 31, 2017, until his death on February 16, 2018. His death was announced by News5 Reporter Maeanne Los Baños on the radio program Balita Alas Singko on Radyo5. He was 88. His remains were then brought to his final resting place at the Libingan ng mga Bayani.

== Exhibits ==
Exhibitions of Napoleon Abueva's work were held in Marco Polo Plaza Cebu.

== Cultural missions ==
- Century 21 Exposition in Seattle, Washington (1962)
- Cultural mission to India
- Cultural mission to Taipei
- Arts Council in England (1964) – special guest
- Venice Biennale (1964)
- Fifth International Congress of Art in Tokyo (1966) – delegate
- Sixth International congress of Art in Amsterdam (1969).
- Biennale de Sao Paulo, Brazil (1969).
- Art exhibit of the Philippine Pavilion in Expo 70, Osaka, Japan

== Awards ==
- First Prize, Sculptural Exhibition by the Art Association of the Philippines (1951)
- First Prize in the Fifth Annual Art Exhibition (1974)
- First Prize and Special Award on the Fourth Sculptural Exhibition (1952)
- Awardee, "The Unknown Political Prisoner" in the International Sculpture Competition by the Institute of Contemporary Arts, London (1953)
- First Prize and Special Award, Kaganapan (Marble), in the Semi-Annual Art Exhibition by the Art Association of the Philippines (1953)
- First Prize, "Kiss of Judas" (Wood) in the Religious Art Exhibition in Detroit, Michigan, USA (1955)
- Purchase Prize, "Water Buffalo" (Marble), in the Annual Show, at St. Louis, Missouri, USA (1956)
- First Prize, "Figure" (Wood) in the Annual Show of the Art Association of the Philippines (1957)
- Most Outstanding Alumnus of the School of Fine Arts, U.P. Golden Jubilee (1958)
- Republic Award for Sculpture (1959)
- Ten Outstanding Young Men of the Philippines (TOYM) Awardee in Sculpture (1959)
- Winner, U.P. Gateway Design Competition (1962)
- Winner, Cultural Heritage Award (1966)
- ASEAN Awards for Visual Arts in Bangkok (1987)
- Fourth ASEAN Achievement Award for Visual Arts in Singapore (July 1995).

== Sources ==
- Lawin Abueva. Death Mask of Benigno S. Aquino, Jr. Mr.& Ms. Cover. November 25, 1983.
- Fe B. Zamora. Death is but a mask of immortality. Mr.& Ms. page 4. November 25, 1983.
- Jose Wendell P. Capili. An Interview with National Artist for Sculpture Napoleon Abueva In Focus: About Culture and Arts. November 3, 2003.
- Abueva, the Artist: National Commission on Culture and the Arts
- Abueva, The Only Boholano National Artist: Bohol Times
- Exhibitions
- Ruel S. De Vera Outstanding in Any Year Philippine Daily Inquirer
- The Fredesvinda – Roots.sg – National Museum of Singapore
