= Loay, Bohol =

Municipality in Bohol, Philippines

Loay
- Municipality
- Municipality of Loay
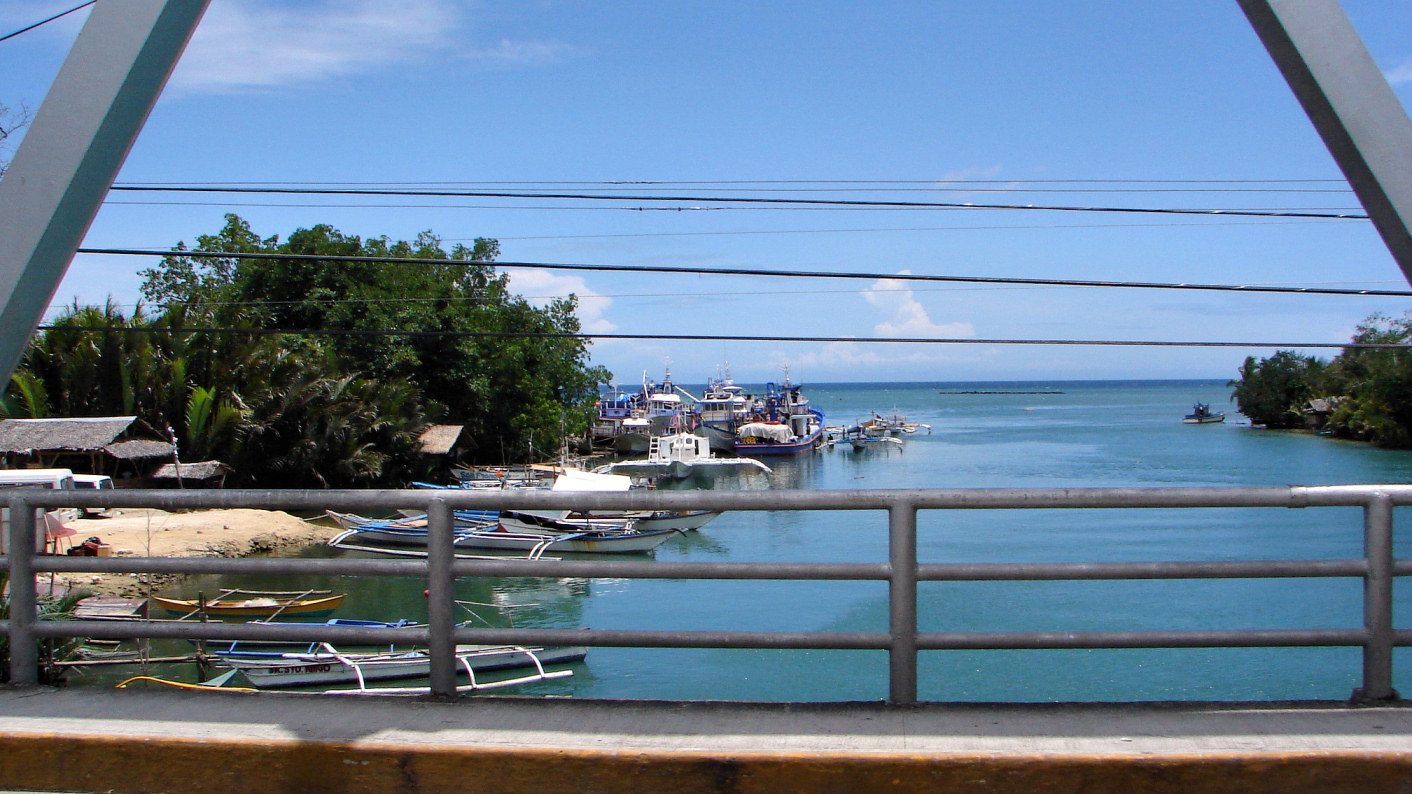
- View of Loboc River at Loay harbour

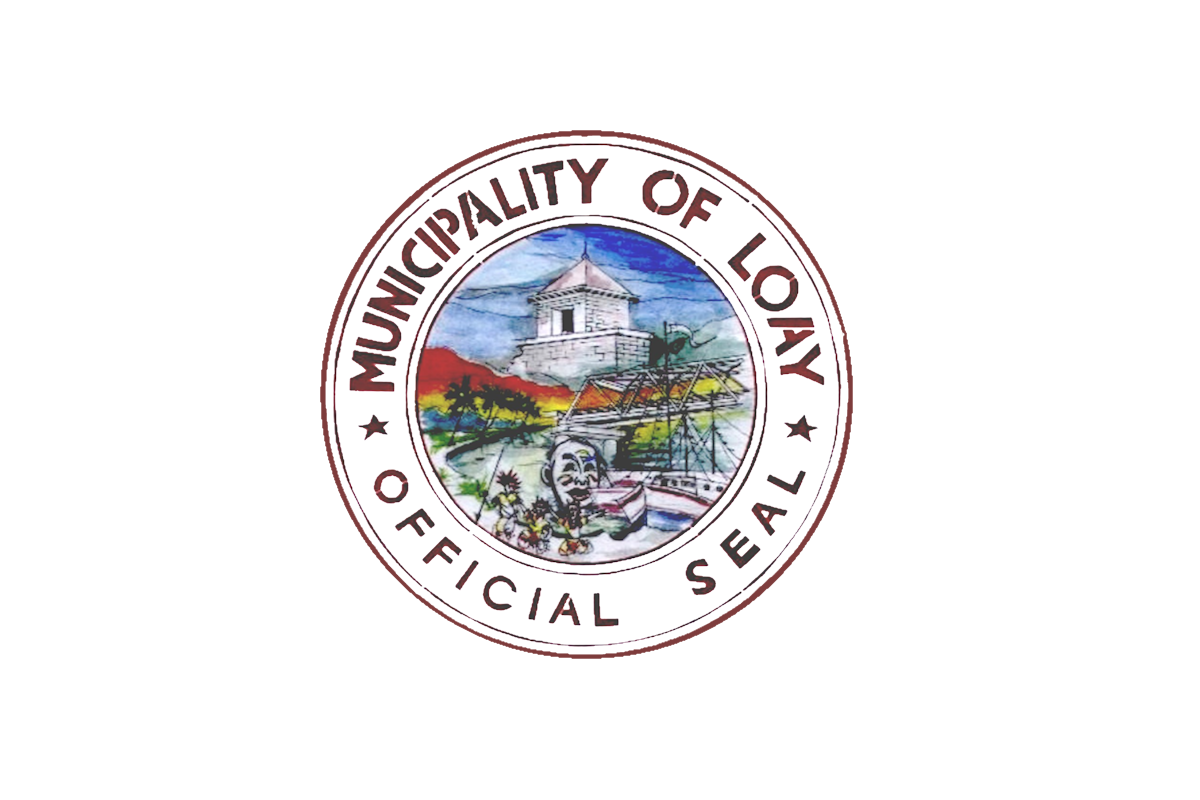
- Flag

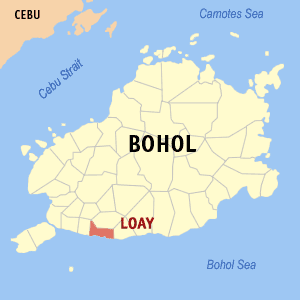
- Map of Bohol with Loay highlighted
- Interactive map of Loay
- Location within the Philippines
- Coordinates: 9°36′N 124°01′E
- Country: Philippines
- Region: Central Visayas
- Province: Bohol
- District: 3rd district
- Founded: 1795
- Barangays: 24 (see Barangays)

Government
  - Type: Sangguniang Bayan
  - Mayor: Hilario L. Ayuban
  - Vice Mayor: Rodrigo B. Cubarol Jr.
  - Representative: Kristine Alexie B. Tutor
  - Municipal Council: Members: Tiburcio P. Bullecer Jr.; Jescelo S. Adiong; Magileo Wilfredo D. Flores; Paulino S. Tejano; Manuelita M. Romero; Raimundo C. Sagaral; Sisinio B. Maquiling; Rey Anthony D. Supanga
  - Electorate: 13,022 voters (2025)

Area
  - Total: 48.24 km^{2} (18.63 sq mi)
- Elevation: 40 m (130 ft)
- Highest elevation: 415 m (1,362 ft)
- Lowest elevation: 0 m (0 ft)

Population (2024 census)
  - Total: 17,957
  - Density: 372.2/km^{2} (964.1/sq mi)
  - Households: 3,962

Economy
  - Income class: 4th municipal income class
  - Poverty incidence: 17.56% (2023)
  - Revenue: ₱ 135.1 million (2024)
  - Assets: ₱ 226.4 million (2024)
  - Expenditure: ₱ 130.3 million (2024)
  - Liabilities: ₱ 43.85 million (2024)

Service provider
  - Electricity: Bohol 1 Electric Cooperative (BOHECO 1)
- Time zone: UTC+8 (PST)
- ZIP code: 6303
- PSGC: 071228000
- IDD : area code: +63 (0)38
- Native languages: Boholano dialect Cebuano; Tagalog

Loay, officially the Municipality of Loay (Cebuano: Munisipalidad sa Loay; Tagalog: Bayan ng Loay), is a municipality in the province of Bohol, Philippines. According to the 2024 census, it has a population of 17,957 people.

Recent historical research found that instead of being in Bool, Tagbilaran, the actual site of the Blood Compact between Legazpi and Sikatuna may be in barangay Hinawanan. Loay is also known for the many antiques discovered in its soils, thus indicating a civilization before the Spanish came to Bohol: it has become a haven for the treasure hunters.

The town of Loay, Bohol celebrates its feast in May, to honor the town patron Santisima Trinidad/Blessed Trinity.

== History ==
During the period 1751–1754, Loay was a small village called Santissima Trinidad located at the strip of the Loboc River, as mentioned in the accounts of Father Juan Delgado (1892).

As a visita, it formerly belonged to the Municipality of Loboc. It was separated from the Loboc mission in 1795, although some state 1815 as the foundation date, and Redondo 1886 reflects that it became an independent parish in 1799. The 1818 Census recorded 1,614 native families and 3 Spanish-Filipino families living in Loay.

The church and belfry of Loay were severely damaged by the 2013 earthquake.

On April 27, 2022, the old Clarin Bridge carrying National Route 850 (N850) over the Loboc River in Loay collapsed, killing 4 people and injuring 15. The bridge was damaged during the 2013 earthquake and still being used while a new replacement bridge was under construction next to it. One possible cause was the stationary traffic on the bridge that exceeded its capacity.

== Geography ==
Located at the mouth of the Loboc River, the municipality can be divided into a lower and an upper part. The lower part used to be called Canipa‑an because of the presence of nipa swamps in this part of the town, while the upper part is named Ibabao, being located on a plateau. Loay is 19 kilometres (12 mi) from Tagbilaran.

=== Barangays ===
Loay is politically subdivided into 24 barangays. Each barangay consists of puroks and some have sitios.

PSGC	Barangay	Population			±% p.a.	
		2024		2010		
071228001	Agape	3.6%	641	551	▴	1.06%
071228002	Alegria Norte	1.7%	300	299	▴	0.02%
071228003	Alegria Sur	5.6%	997	961	▴	0.26%
071228004	Bonbon	1.6%	282	314	▾	−0.74%
071228005	Botoc Occidental	3.4%	619	521	▴	1.20%
071228006	Botoc Oriental	3.6%	644	648	▾	−0.04%
071228007	Calvario	4.6%	828	715	▴	1.02%
071228008	Concepcion	3.8%	691	732	▾	−0.40%
071228010	Hinawanan	2.3%	414	364	▴	0.90%
071228011	Las Salinas Norte	1.5%	272	217	▴	1.58%
071228012	Las Salinas Sur	4.3%	774	749	▴	0.23%
071228013	Palo	2.2%	397	335	▴	1.19%
071228014	Poblacion Ibabao	6.9%	1,231	1,220	▴	0.06%
071228015	Poblacion Ubos	3.9%	700	775	▾	−0.70%
071228016	Sagnap	2.8%	506	503	▴	0.04%
071228017	Tambangan	4.3%	778	763	▴	0.14%
071228018	Tangcasan Norte	4.1%	729	699	▴	0.29%
071228019	Tangcasan Sur	4.7%	846	896	▾	−0.40%
071228020	Tayong Occidental	2.8%	511	451	▴	0.87%
071228021	Tayong Oriental	5.4%	963	1,011	▾	−0.34%
071228023	Tocdog Dacu	3.8%	677	701	▾	−0.24%
071228024	Tocdog Ilaya	2.3%	415	424	▾	−0.15%
071228025	Villalimpia	9.5%	1,697	1,674	▴	0.09%
071228026	Yanangan	4.3%	779	738	▴	0.38%
	Total		17,957	16,261	▴	0.69%

=== Climate ===
Climate data for Loay, Bohol
Month	Jan	Feb	Mar	Apr	May	Jun	Jul	Aug	Sep	Oct	Nov	Dec	Year
Mean daily maximum °C (°F)	28 (82)	29 (84)	30 (86)	31 (88)	31 (88)	30 (86)	30 (86)	30 (86)	30 (86)	29 (84)	29 (84)	29 (84)	30 (85)
Mean daily minimum °C (°F)	23 (73)	22 (72)	23 (73)	23 (73)	24 (75)	25 (77)	24 (75)	24 (75)	24 (75)	24 (75)	23 (73)	23 (73)	24 (74)
Average precipitation mm (inches)	102 (4.0)	85 (3.3)	91 (3.6)	75 (3.0)	110 (4.3)	141 (5.6)	121 (4.8)	107 (4.2)	111 (4.4)	144 (5.7)	169 (6.7)	139 (5.5)	1,395 (55.1)
Average rainy days	18.6	14.8	16.5	16.7	23.9	26.4	25.6	24.1	24.4	26.3	23.7	20.5	261.5
Source: Meteoblue (modeled/calculated data, not measured locally)

== Demographics ==
Population census of Loay

Year	Pop.	±% p.a.
1903	8,941	—
1918	10,513	+1.09%
1939	11,093	+0.26%
1948	10,694	−0.41%
1960	10,137	−0.44%
1970	10,634	+0.48%

Year	Pop.	±% p.a.
1975	11,256	+1.15%
1980	10,842	−0.75%
1990	12,677	+1.58%
1995	12,450	−0.34%
2000	14,433	+3.22%
2007	15,881	+1.33%

Year	Pop.	±% p.a.
2010	16,261	+0.86%
2015	16,691	+0.50%
2020	17,855	+1.43%
2024	17,957	+0.14%

Source: Philippine Statistics Authority

== Economy ==
Poverty incidence of Loay (%)

Source: Philippine Statistics Authority

== Tourism ==
Loay is one of the locations to take a Loboc river lunch cruise.

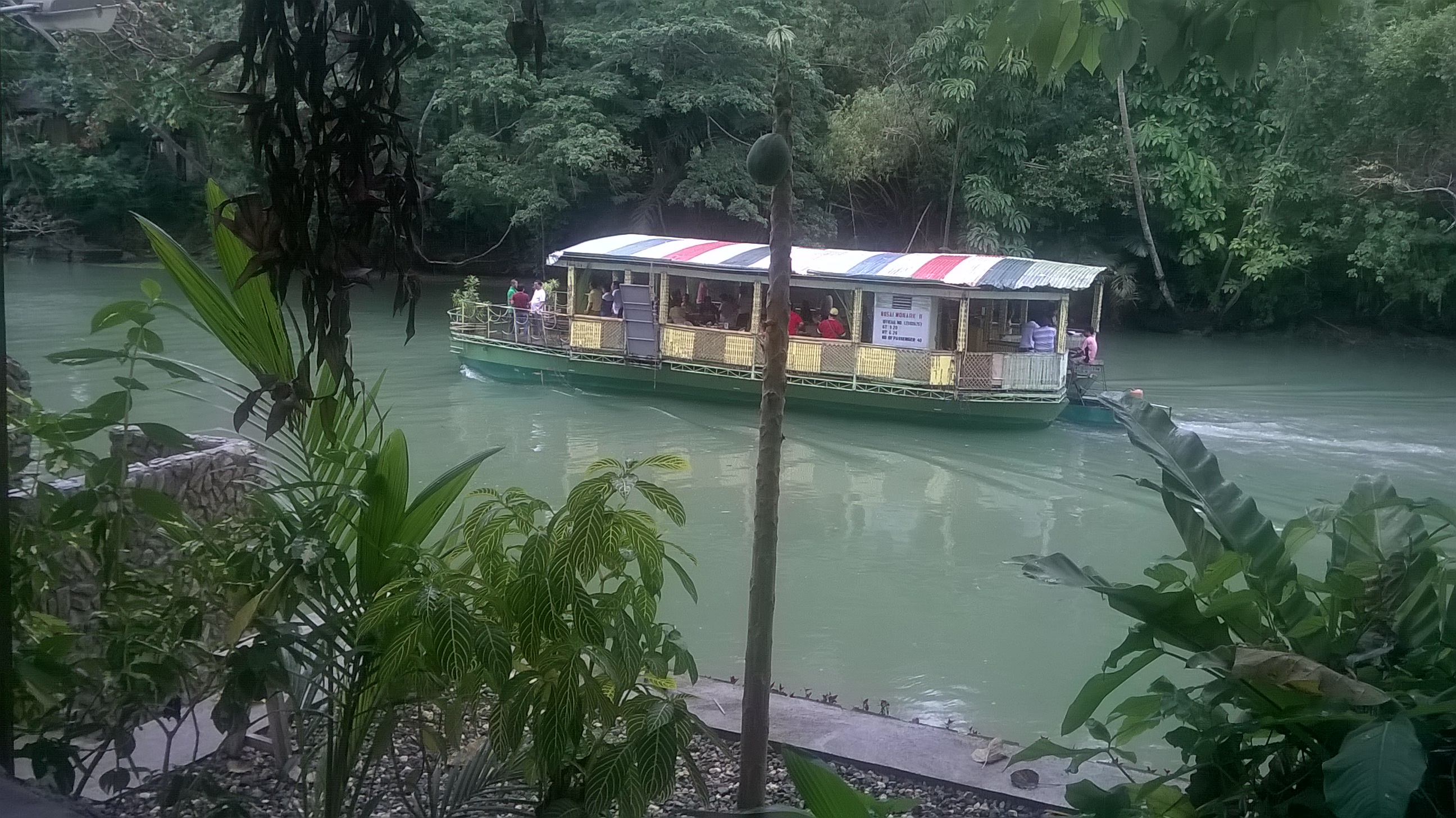
Lunch cruise on the Loboc river

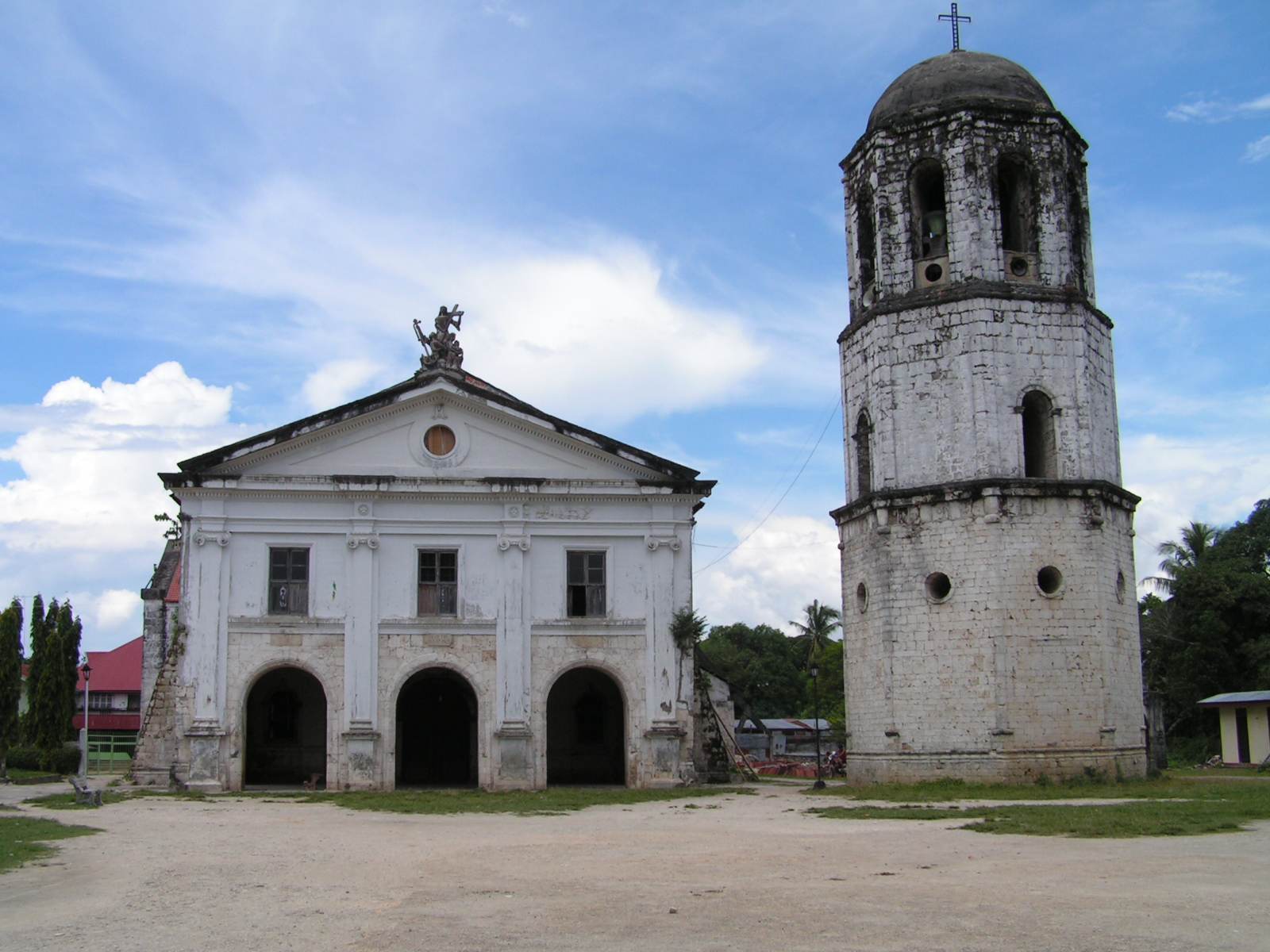
Loay Church in 2006

Loay Blood Compact site

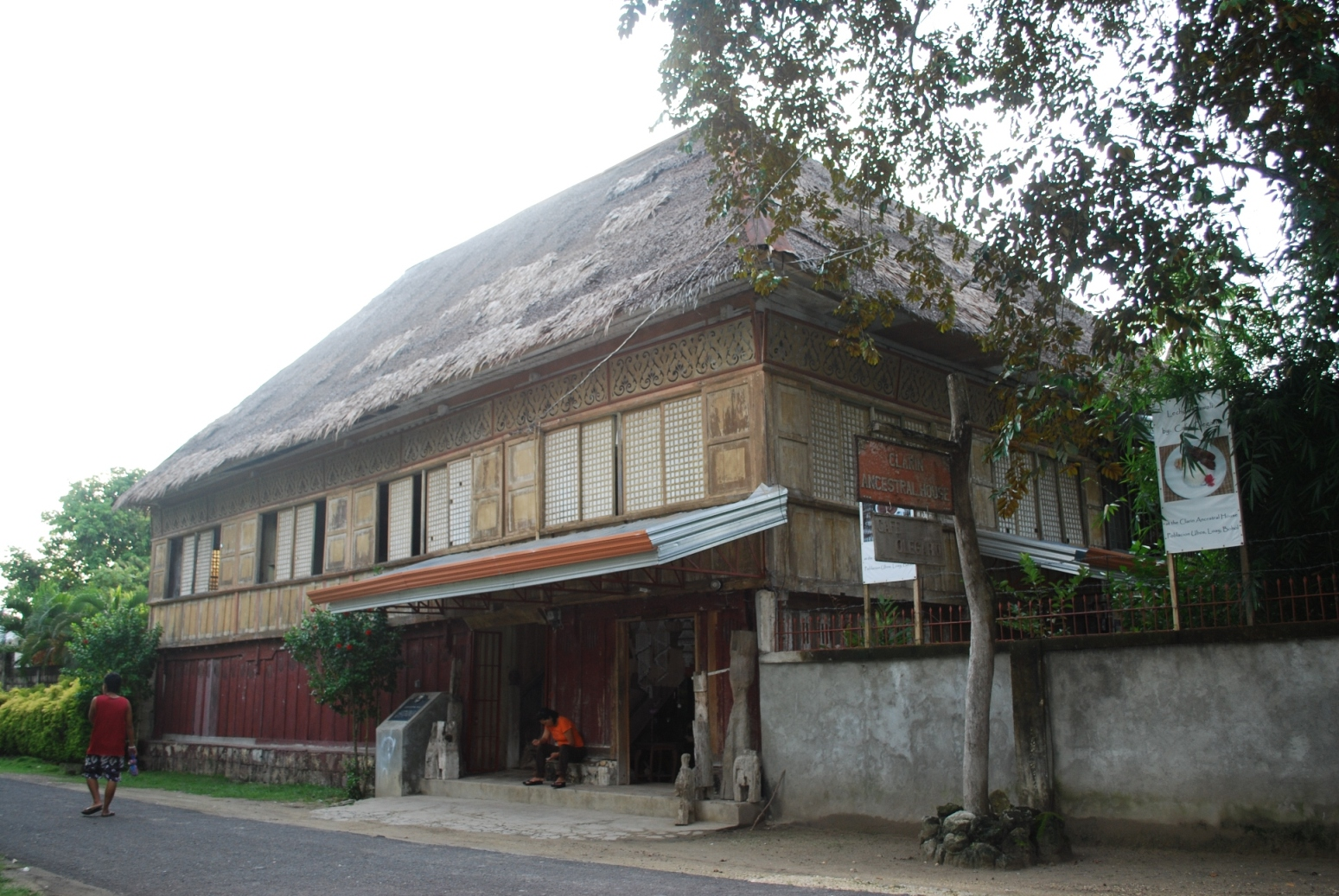
Clarin Ancestral House

== Sources ==
- Delgado, Fr Juan José (1892). Historia sacro-profana, política y natural de las Islas del Poniente, llamadas Filipinas (in Spanish). Manila: Imprenta de "Eco de Filipinas" de D. Juan Atayde. OCLC 351181.
- Sendino y Redondo, Felipe (1886). Breve reseña de lo que fue y de lo que es la Diócesis de Cebú en las Islas Filipinas (in Spanish). Manila: Colegio de Santo Tomas.
