= Loay Church =

Roman Catholic church in Bohol, Philippines

- Holy Trinity Parish Church
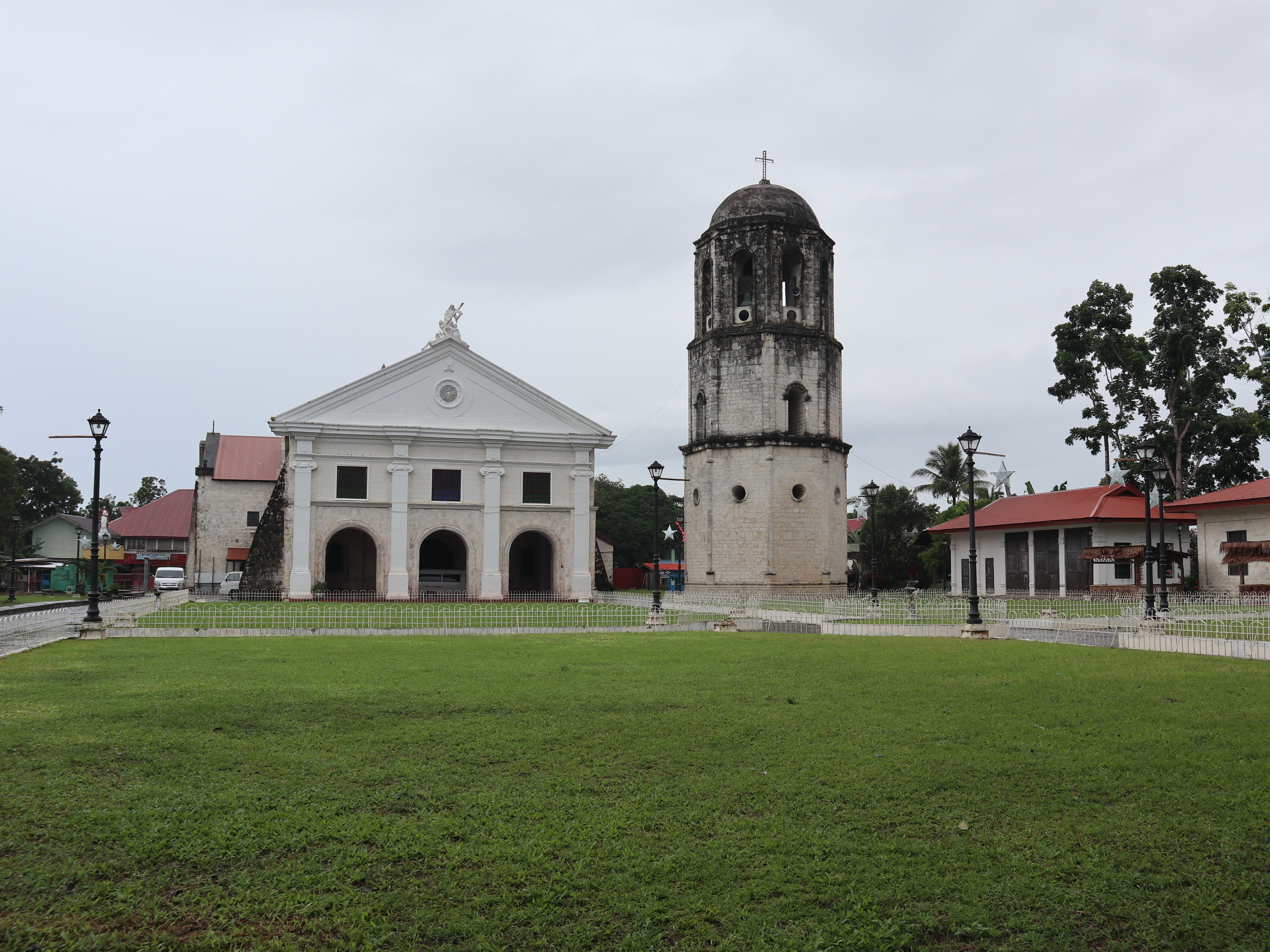
- Loay Church in 2023

- Location in the Visayas Location in the Philippines
- 9°36′03.57″N 124°00′43.4″E
- Location: Poblacion Ubos, Loay, Bohol
- Country: Philippines
- Denomination: Roman Catholic

History
- Status: Parish church
- Dedication: Most Holy Trinity

Architecture
- Functional status: Active
- Heritage designation: National Historical Landmark and National Cultural Treasure
- Designated: 2003 and 2013
- Architectural type: Church building
- Completed: 1822; 204 years ago

Administration
- Diocese: Tagbilaran

Holy Trinity Parish Church, commonly known as Loay Church, is a Roman Catholic church located in Loay, Bohol, Philippines. It is under the jurisdiction of the Diocese of Tagbilaran.

Built in 1822, the church stands on a hill facing the sea and near the mouth of Loboc River. Like the other churches in Bohol, it has a side pulpit near the altar, a pipe organ, and choir loft propped up by tall columns. The church's ceilings were painted by Raymundo Francia in 1927.

== 2013 Bohol earthquake ==
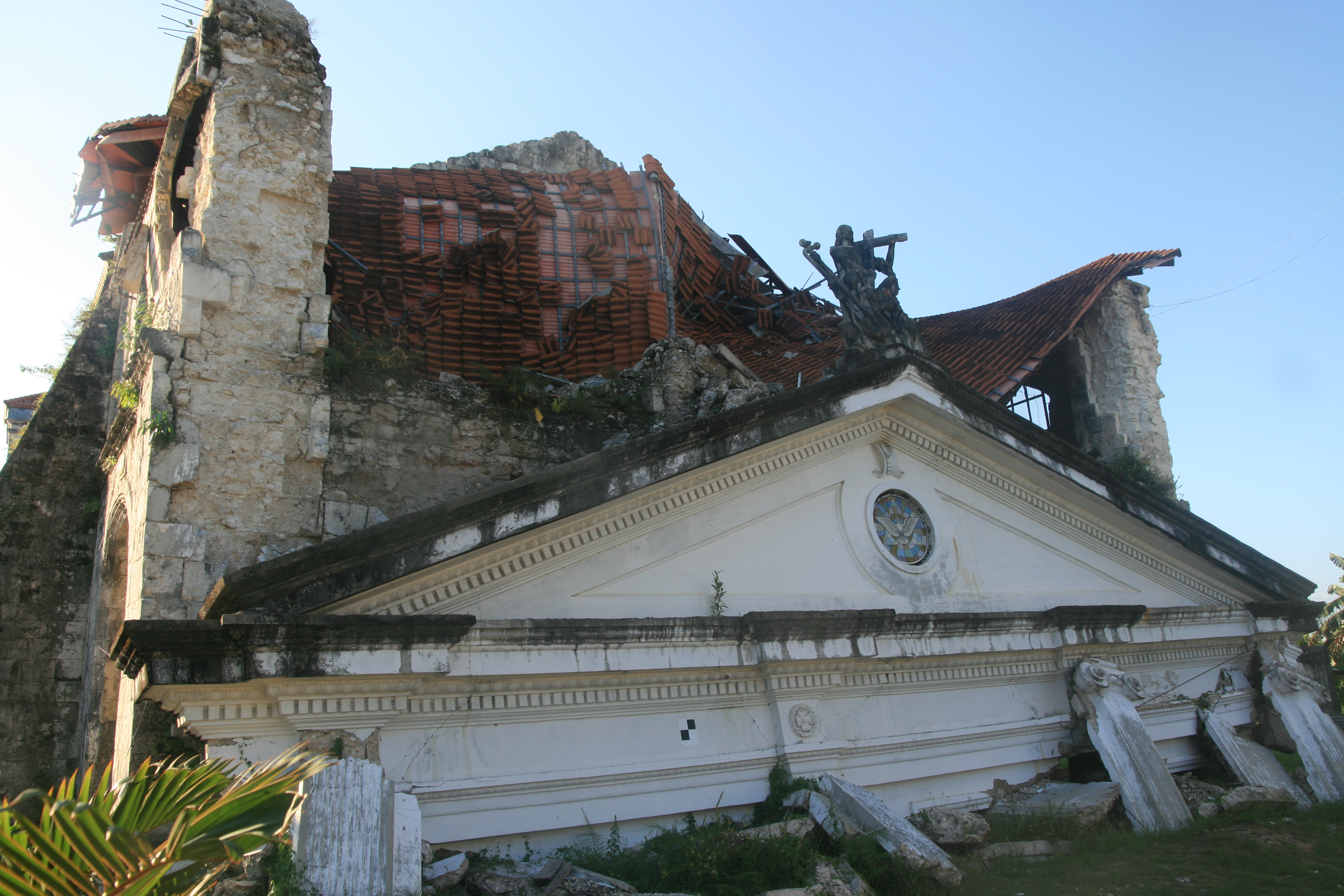
Church's facade destroyed during the 2013 Bohol earthquake

The church was damaged by the 7.2-magnitude 2013 Bohol earthquake. The collapse of the front facade wall of the church was partly due to the lack of connecting material between the old wall and a new portico facade added during the 19th century.

=== Restoration ===
The church was fully restored in 2020. Included in the church's restoration is its coral stone walls, roof, and ceiling paintings.

Nearby to the church, the Escuela delos Niños y Niñas and the Casa Tribunal were also restored. They were converted by the National Historical Commission of the Philippines (NHCP) into a museum and conservation laboratory, respectively.

== Recognitions ==
The NHCP declared the church as a national historical landmark in 2003. Meanwhile, the National Museum of the Philippines declared it a national cultural treasure in 2013.

== Gallery ==
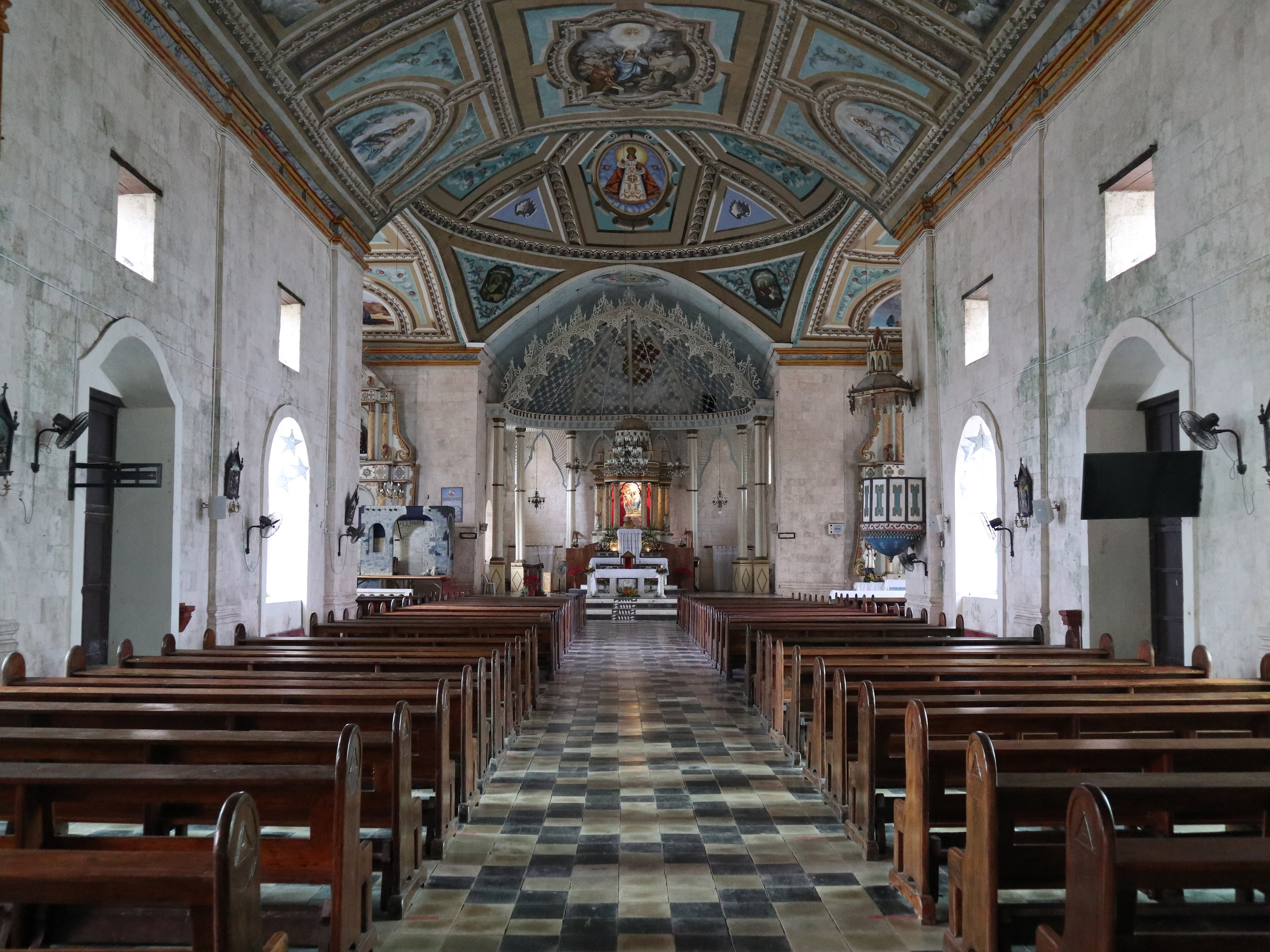
Church interior in 2023

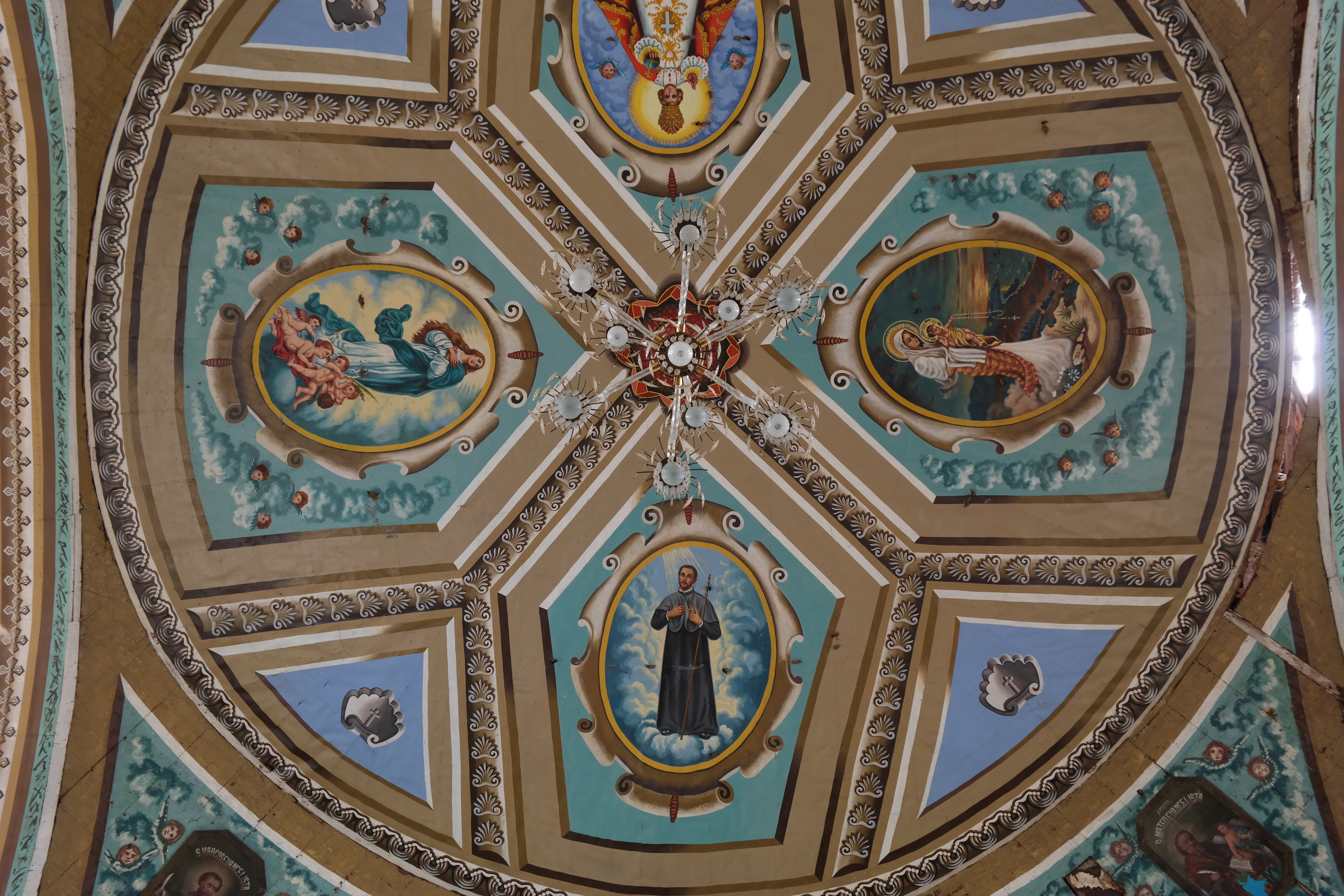
Church ceiling

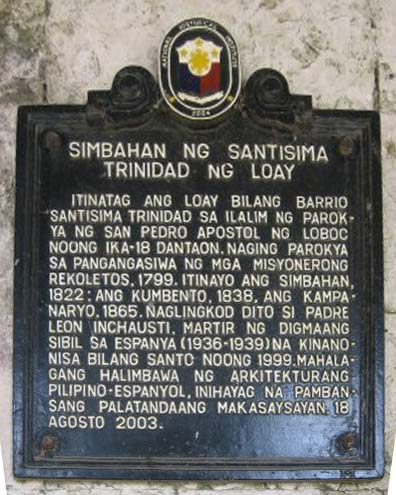
Church NHI historical marker
