= Datu Sikatuna =

Chieftain of Bo-ol, present-day Bohol, Philippines

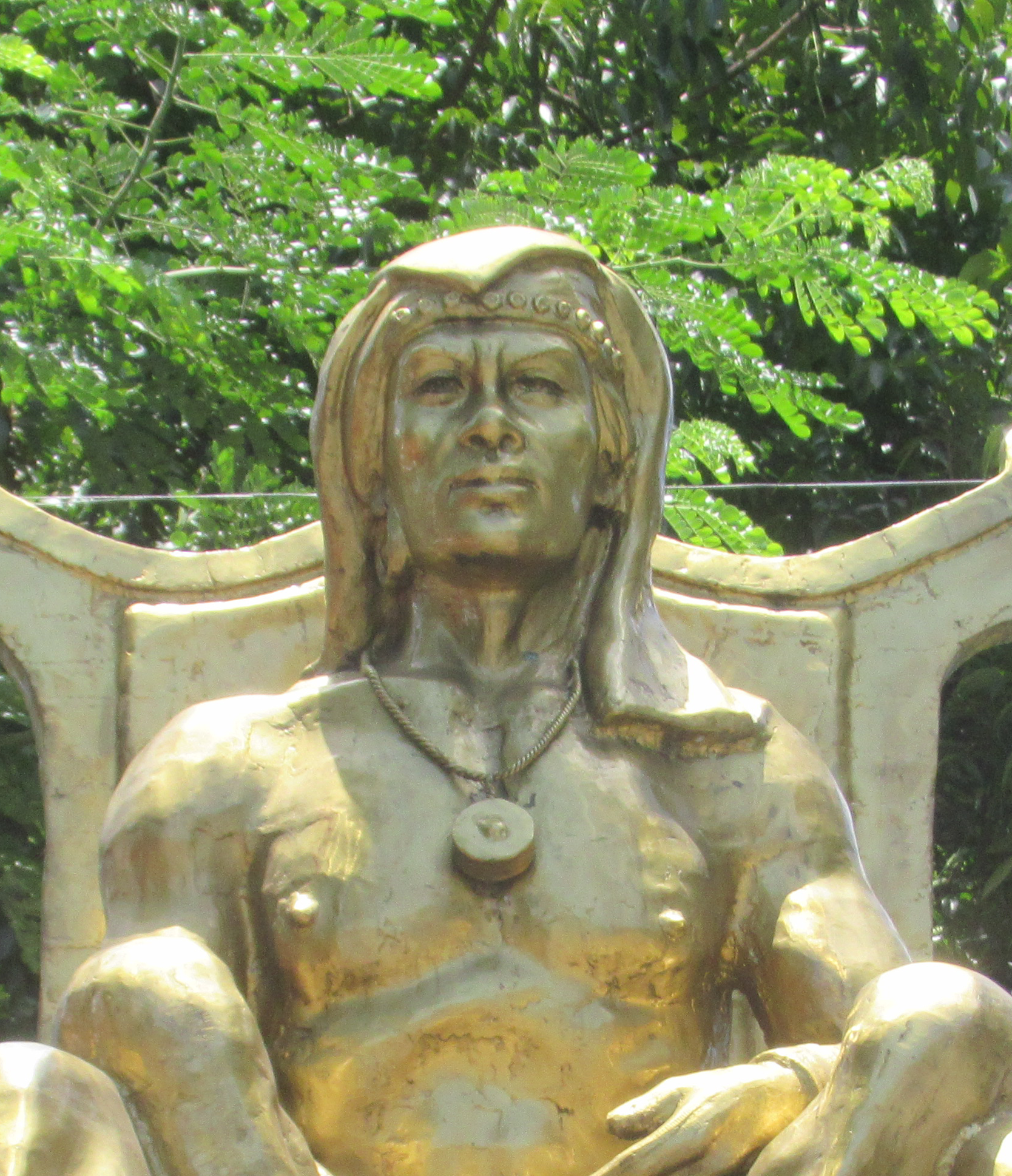
Statue of Datu Sikatuna in Sikatuna Village, Diliman, Quezon City

Datu Sikatuna (or Catunao) was a Datu or chieftain of Bo-ol in the island of Bohol in the Philippines. He made a blood compact (sanduguan) and alliance with the Spanish explorer Miguel López de Legazpi on March 25, 1565 at Hinawanan Bay, barangay Hinawanan, Loay. Their blood compact is the first Treaty of Friendship between Spain and the Philippines. The previous site of the pact was thought to have been at barangay Bool, Tagbilaran City but later a panel of historians concluded that the event actually happened at barangay Hinawanan, Loay, Bohol as ratified through Resolution No. 4, issued by the National Historical Institute in 2005.

== Bo-ol ==
The brothers, Datu Pagbuaya and Datu Dailisan, were rulers of Bo-ol before the arrival of the Spaniards. The vast kingdom has control over the present-day Bohol, Siquijor, Tanjay, Northern Mindanao from Zamboanga to Surigao; Southern Leyte, and Eastern Mindanao up to Davao Oriental, with its capital at Tagbilaran Strait. Datu Sigala and Datu Sikatuna were relatives of the two previously mentioned brothers, recorded as minor chiefs. Sigala was older than Sikatuna, who was said to have a higher rank. The auxiliary word "Si" is the nominative prefix for minor chiefs of the Visayas, such as Si Catipan, Si Batumay, Si Maquio, and Si Cabon of Cebu, which is also similar to the Sanskrit Sri honorific also used among other precolonial Philippine rulers, such as Sipad the Older, also known as Sri Pada of Lupah Sug. Sigala was the ruler of Loboc centered in barangay Himilian, while Sikatuna was the chief of Baclayon with his seat of government at barangay Guiwanon.

When the Sultanate of Ternate with the help of the Portuguese attacked Panglao in 1563, the surviving royal family sought refuge in Dapitan. After the battle, Sikatuna was heavily wounded and Sigala took him in Himilian, Loboc to recuperate. Sigala and Sikatuna chose to remain in Bohol and eventually became the caretakers of the kingdom. The destruction of the kingdom was earlier prophesied by a 15th-century babaylan (medium) named Karyapa (or Caryapa), the first known native poet of the pre-Philippines.

== Arrival of Legaspi ==
On November 21, 1564, El Adelantado Governor-General Miguel López de Legaspi led an expedition and departed from Barra de Navidad, Mexico (formerly Nueva España) in search for spices and the Spice Islands as commissioned by Viceroy Luis de Velasco by the royal order of King Philip II of Spain. With him were Augustinian friars — Fr. Andrés de Urdaneta, also a known navigator served as their spiritual adviser, Fr. Martín de Rada, Fr. Diego de Herrera, Fr. Andrés de Aguirre, Fr. Lorenzo Jimenez de Esteban, and Fr. Pedro de Gamboa. Also included in the expedition were Spaniards — soldiers Martín de Goiti, Alonso de Arellano, Mateo del Saz, Melchor de Legaspi (Legaspi's son), Felipe de Salcedo (Legaspi's grandson), the future Governor-General Guido de Lavezaris (successor of Legaspi), a survivor of the 1521 Magellan's circumnavigation, and more than 200 others. The expedition was composed of the Capitana, which carried on board Legazpi and Urdaneta, the galleons San Pablo and San Pedro, and the ship's tenders San Juan and San Lucas. This was the fifth, the last, and the most successful of all Spanish expeditions after Ferdinand Magellan in 1521, García Jofre de Loaísa in 1525, Sebastian Cabot in 1526, Álvaro de Saavedra Cerón in 1527, and Ruy López de Villalobos in 1542 before Spanish colonization of the Philippines.

The expedition reached Guam on January 23, 1565; Samar and Leyte on February 13; Limasawa on March 9; and Camiguin on March 11. On March 14, they attempted reach Butuan, but unfortunately drifted by strong currents to Bohol at night. On March 15 at daybreak, they arrived offshore at Jagna, Bohol and commissioned a light ship, San Juan to go Butuan, while the rest will wait for them in Bohol. While in Bohol, they captured a Bornean native parao (ship), piloted by Tuasanmalea, also a Bornean. The pilot narrated that the natives were already agitated with their arrival since the island was previously ransacked by foreigners, Ternatans and Portuguese two years earlier during the fall of Bool Kingdom. On March 19, 1565, they landed at Hinawanan Bay in Loay, Bohol.

Wary of the possible violent reaction from Boholanos, Legaspi tasked Tuasanmalea to look for the chief of the island as to make a friendly alliance with them, stressing that they aren't those barbaric Portuguese but rather peaceful Spaniards. Tuasanmalea travelled through Loboc river from Hinawanan Bay (now part of Villalimpia, Loay), 2 leagues (about 11 km) away to Himilian (Jimilian), the seat of government of Datu Sigala. However, during that time, Sigala was not in Himilian. Instead, Datu Sikatuna welcomed him and told the pilot to let their commander (Legaspi) come to make a Sandugo with him as to seal their alliance. However, when Tuasanmalea returned, he only brought Santiago de Garnica, the constable-in-charge of water of Capitana. Knowing that Garcina was not their leader, Sikatuna only allowed his son to make a blood compact with the former. Sikatuna then agreed to walk towards the shore to meet Legaspi.

The next morning, Datu Sikatuna, accompanied with about 40 warriors and women arrived at the shoreline of Hinawanan. They were greeted by the Spaniards and eventually requested Sikatuna to board San Pedro and to meet Legaspi. With several Spaniards remained at the shore, Sikatuna agreed to board the flagship with 4 companions: Sibumanglar (Si Bumanglar), a Boholano, about 30 years old; Ximongoi (Si Mungoy), also a Boholano, 25 years old; Ceilan, a Bornean interpreter, about 35 years old; and Magut, also a Bornean, 25 years old. These Borneans were already in Bohol which either be merely traders or captives. These 4 companions executed 4 affidavits in the presence of Hernado Riquel, Legaspi's chief clerk for administrative matters. The affidavits narrated the detailed events during the attack of the Portuguese and Ternateans in Bool Kingdom in 1563.

Off the coast of Hinawanan Bay, Loay, Bohol and on the flagship San Pedro, the symbolic Pacto de Sangre (Sandugo) between Datu Sikatuna and Governor-General Miguel López de Legaspi was performed, sealing the first treaty of peace and friendship on March 25, 1565.

Another blood compact was performed, this time between Legaspi and Datu Sigala, the chieftain of Loboc on March 28, 1565. This Sandugo was said to be more consequential than the former since it was done in a more traditional manner. The wine used during their blood compact was the native Tubâ (palm toddy) mixed in a Hangot (coconut shell cup) instead of Spanish goblet. Sigala also shared a cantaro (about 4 gallons) of tubâ and a native lechon to the Spaniards, signifying the hospitality and generosity of Filipinos towards foreign cultures.

While still in Bohol, Legaspi sent a frigate to explore the islands of Cebu. However, despite his instruction to return after eight days, the frigate failed to return even after 15 days. Saddened by the situation, Legaspi sought help and immediately requested Sigala and Sikatuna to find the frigate in Cebu. Accompanied with two Spanish soldiers, the two chiefs went to Cebu on board a large armed boat with thirty rowers. Unfortunately, the chiefs reported that the frigate was not there when they returned to Bohol. Later, Legaspi decided to bring the whole fleet to Cebu on April 27, 1565 where they defeated Rajah Tupas, establishing the first Spanish colony in the Philippines, Villa del Santísimo Nombre de Jesús ("Town of the Most Holy Name of Jesus") and declaring it as its first capital.

== Later life ==
On November 17, 1595, two Jesuit priests, Fr. Juan de Torres and Fr. Gabriel Sánchez, left Cebu and arrived in Baclayon. The Jesuits then organized a Christian community and Baclayon became a Residencia, the center of the Bohol missions under the supervision of the Diocese of Cebu.

On July 16, 1597, Fr. Sánchez found the ageing Sikatuna in the hinterlands of Baclayon. The chieftain and his wife Albasea were then given the catechism and baptised into the Catholic Church. They received Christian names: Joaquín and Ana, after the parents of the Blessed Virgin Mary, whose feast day was on July 16. Icons of Saints Joachim and Anne are still found at the altar of the renovated Baclayon Church. The Jesuits were delighted that were able to convert Sikatuna, whom they found out to be the same chief who made the symbolic blood compact with Spanish conquistador Legaspi.

The Jesuits popularised the conversion of Sikatuna (under the name of Joaquín), which also aided them in the evangelization of the province. Thus, Sikatuna was often mistakenly declared the ruler of Bohol over the higher-ranked Datu Sigala, who never converted to Christianity.

== Related Arts ==
The Blood Compact (Spanish: El Pacto de Sangre) is a painting made as a commemoration of the pact by famous artist Juan Luna in 1886 and is permanently enshrined at the Malacañan Palace. On Luna's painting, it was his future brother-in-law and an Ilustrado, Trinidad H. Pardo de Tavera, who posed as Legazpi, and national hero, Dr. Jose Rizal posed as Sikatuna. It was both exhibited in Barcelona and the Universal Exposition at Saint Louis in 1904. Another similar painting was made by national artist, Carlos Modesto "Botong" Villaluz Francisco.

The Blood Compact Shrine was made in commemoration of the blood compact locally known as the Sandugo, which is located at barangay Bool, Tagbilaran City. The said monument is a work by the renowned Filipino National Artist for sculpture and Boholano native Napoleon Veloso Abueva.

== Legacy ==
- Order of Sikatuna, the highest national order of diplomatic merit of the Philippines awarded by the Secretary of Foreign Affairs in the name and by authority of the President.
- BRP Datu Sikatuna (PF-5), one of Philippine Navy's ex-USN Cannon-class destroyer escorts
- Sikatuna, a municipality in Bohol named after him.
- Sandugo Festival, a yearly festival in Bohol commemorating the blood compact between Datu Sikatuna and conquistador Miguel López de Legazpi.
- Rajah Sikatuna Protected Landscape and National Park, an IUCN Level V protected landscape in Bohol
- Sikatuna, a barangay in Talibon, Bohol
- Sikatuna, a barangay of the first District in Butuan
- Sikatuna, a barangay in the municipality of Isabela, Negros Occidental
- Sikatuna Village, a barangay in Quezon City
- Sikatuna, a barangay in Guipos, Zamboanga del Sur
- Rajah Sikatuna Avenue, one of the busiest streets in Dampas District, Tagbilaran City
- Sikatuna Street, a street in Cebu City
- Sikatuna Street, a street in Agdao, Davao City
- Sikatuna Street, a street in Old Albay District, Legazpi City
- Sikatuna Street, a street in Sampaloc, Manila

== See also ==
- History of the Philippines
