= Huluga Caves =

Prehistoric site in the Philippines

The Huluga Caves are located inside the Huluga archaeological complex in Cagayan de Oro, Philippines. They are on the brow of a limestone cliff on the eastern side of Cagayan de Oro River. The cave complex was discovered by a resident who then notified the Xavier University – Ateneo de Cagayan. The University then sent for the National Museum of the Philippines in Manila which sent representatives in 1971 to survey the area. Skeletal remains and artifacts found in the caves were estimated to date back to 377 A.D. through the racemization dating technique conducted by the University of California's Scripps Institution of Oceanography.

== See also ==
- Macajalar Bay
