= Blood compact =

Filipino ancient ritual

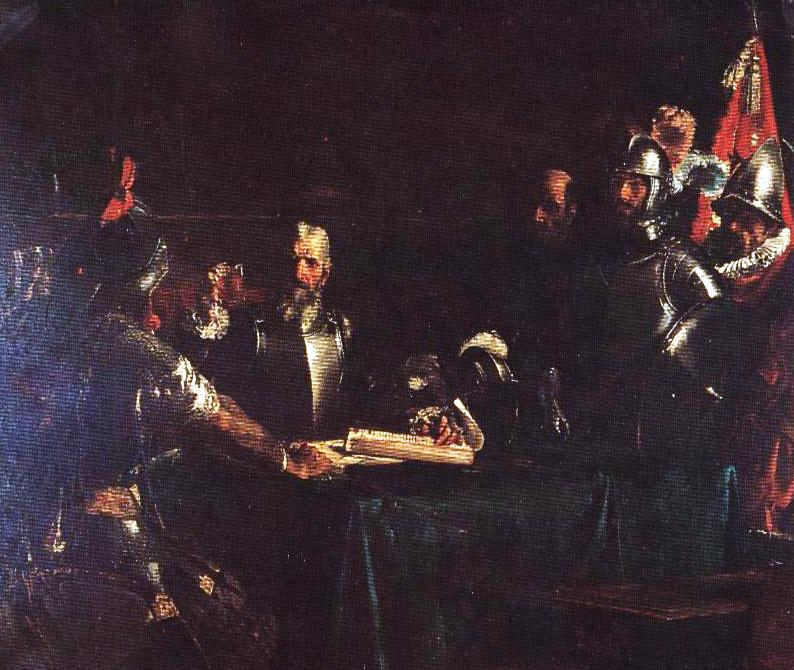
The Blood Compact (1886), a painting of the Pacto de Sangre or Sandugo by Juan Luna

Blood compact (Spanish: Pacto de sangre; Tagalog: Sanduguan) was an ancient ritual in the Philippines intended to seal a friendship or treaty, or to validate an agreement. The contracting parties would cut their hands and pour their blood into a cup filled with liquid, such as wine, and drink the mixture.

A famous example of the blood compact was the 1565 El Pacto de Sangre or Sandugo between Spanish explorer Miguel López de Legazpi and Datu Sikatuna, the chieftain of Bohol. An earlier blood compact, the first between natives and Europeans took place in 1521 between navigator Ferdinand Magellan and Rajah Humabon of Cebu.

Another type of blood compact was also described by Antonio Pigafetta during their stopover in Palawan (after the death of Magellan). It was made between the crew of the expedition and a datu of Palawan as a symbol of peaceful intentions. The datu made a small cut on his chest using a knife borrowed from the expedition. The datu then dipped a finger on the blood and touched it to the tip of his tongue and on his forehead. The crew of the expedition did the same to seal the compact.

A similar ritual was practiced by initiates into the 19th century revolutionary group, the Katipunan. Though they did not consume their blood, they used it to sign their membership contracts.

Another relatively recent blood compact was in the 1860s between the close friends Sultan Jamalul Alam of the Sultanate of Sulu and Herman Leopold Schück, a Prussian merchant mariner. Schück eventually settled in Sulu and introduced the Kahawa Sug coffee varietal to the islands.

== See also ==
- Blood oath (ritual)
