= List of barangays in Tagbilaran =

Tagbilaran City is politically subdivided into 15 barangays.

The city is part of the 1st legislative district of the Province of Bohol.

As of 2015, 12 barangays are classified as urban barangays where 93,011 (88.54%) of Tagbilaran City's population lives, while the remaining 3 rural barangays are home to 12,040 residents, representing 11.46% of the total population.

Cogon is the most populous barangay in the city with a population of 17,750 while Cabawan is the least populous barangay with only 1,734 residents. Bool recorded a 17.45% increase in population, the highest in the city while Poblacion III decreased 2.94% in terms of population.

== List of Barangays ==
Barangays of Tagbilaran City
Administration		Population			PSGC Code and Class	
Barangay	Barangay Captain (Since June 30, 2019)	2015	2010	Change	Code	Urban/Rural
Bool	Alfredo Balangkig Angalot	6,132	5,221	+17.45%	071242001	Urban
Booy	Eulogia Galon Ayeng	9,838	8,800	+11.80%	071242002	Urban
Cabawan	Sergio Montesco Bangalao	1,734	1,531	+13.26%	071242003	Rural
Cogon	Nicanor Sarabia Besas	17,750	17,114	+3.72%	071242004	Urban
Dao	Alberto Romana Puagang	8,858	8,227	+7.67%	071242005	Urban
Dampas	Edgar Ramirez Bompat	9,838	8,440	+16.56%	071242006	Urban
Manga	Deogracias Iballa Dalida	7,224	6,460	+11.83%	071242008	Urban
Mansasa	Bernadette Bioco Blanco	6,069	6,156	−1.41%	071242009	Urban
Poblacion I	Arlene Pondoc Karaan	3,057	3,072	−0.49%	071242010	Urban
Poblacion II	Allan Ricardo Dolotina	5,431	5,029	+7.99%	071242011	Urban
Poblacion III	Odysseus Chatto Glovasa	5,873	6,051	−2.94%	071242012	Urban
San Isidro	Fausto Sebandal Budlong	5,424	4,821	+12.51%	071242013	Rural
Taloto	Eugenio Grupo Zamora	7,367	6,376	+15.54%	071242014	Urban
Tiptip	Jeminador Gabaca Lantape	4,882	4,360	+11.97%	071242015	Rural
Ubujan	Maryjane Dahab Ruiz	5,574	5,134	+8.57%	071242016	Urban
Tagbilaran City		105,051	96,792			
Source: Philippine Statistics Authority - Philippine Standard Geographic Code - Tagbilaran City - Barangays
