= Sandugo =

1565 blood compact between Miguel López de Legazpi and Datu Sikatuna

The Legazpi-Sikatuna Blood Compact, or Sandugo (Spanish: Pacto de Sangre), was a blood compact, performed on the island of Bohol in the Philippines, between the Spanish explorer Miguel López de Legazpi and Datu Sikatuna, chieftain of Bohol, on March 16, 1565, to seal their friendship following tribal tradition. This is considered the first treaty of friendship between the Spaniards and Filipinos. Sandugo is a Visayan word meaning "one blood".

The Sandugo is depicted on both the provincial flag and the official seal of the government of Bohol. The official seal of the government of Tagbilaran also features the image of the blood compact. The top of the seal explains the history behind the Sandugo event, the fleet and the location where the Spaniards anchored, and the place where the treaty was conducted.

== History ==
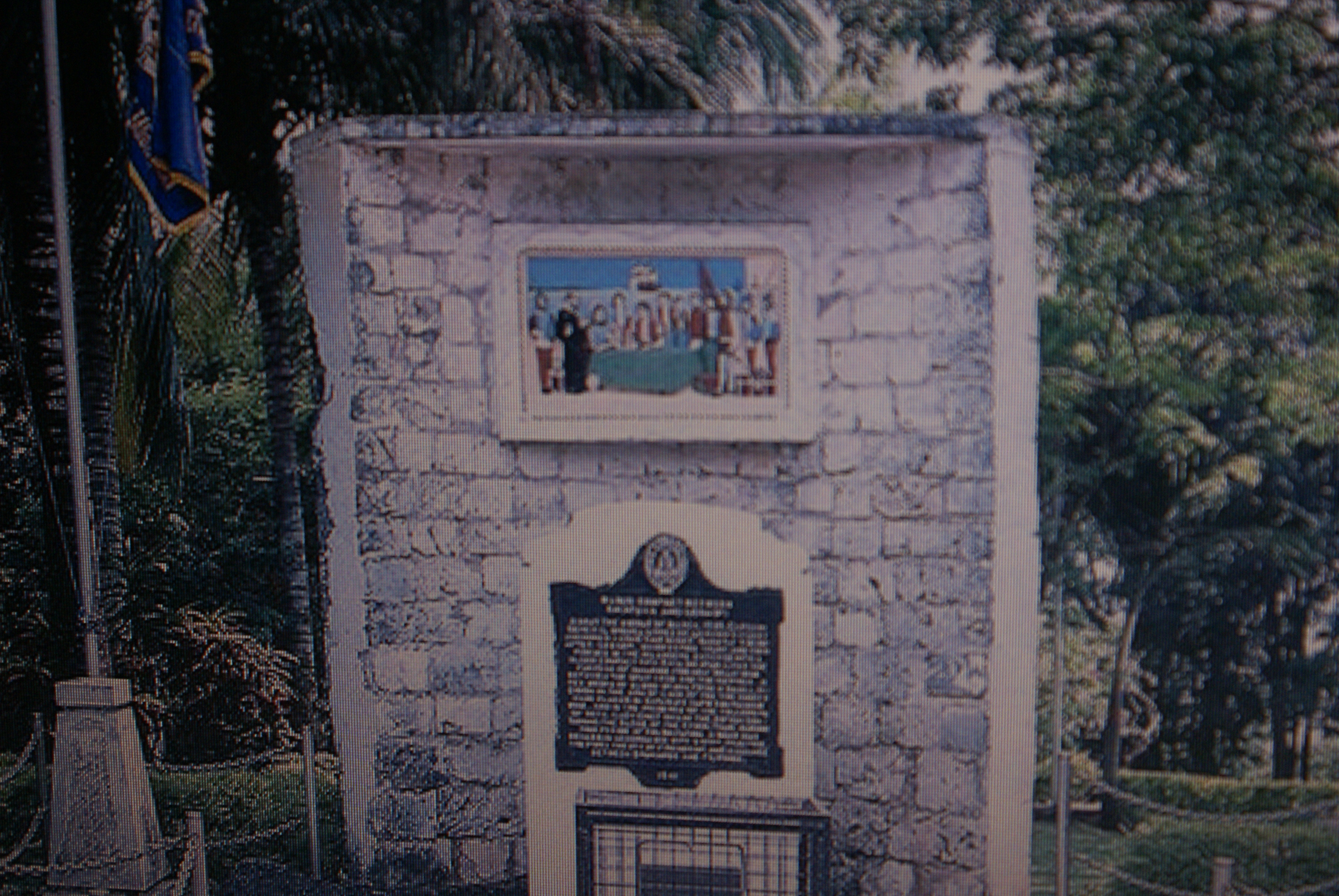
Blood Compact shrine in Bohol, where the blood compact was conducted.

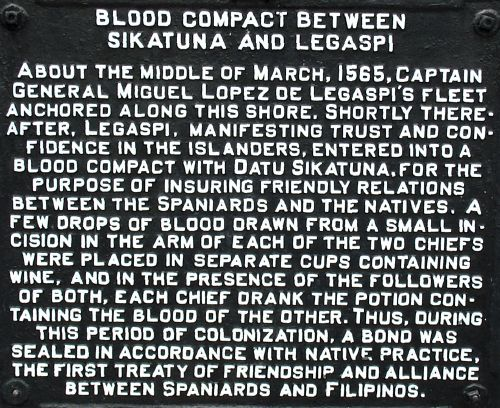
Inscription on a plaque on the Blood Compact marker at the Blood Compact shrine, Bool District, Tagbilaran City

In 1521, navigator Ferdinand Magellan arrived in the Moluccas on a Spanish expedition. This made his fleet the first people from Europe to reach Asia by sailing west, although Magellan would meet an untimely death on the islands of the Philippines. Afterwards, Spain sent expeditions to colonize the East Indies in their competition with Portugal to seize control over the spice trade. However, all of these expeditions failed until Miguel López de Legazpi, sailing from Mexico with five ships and 500 men, reached the Philippines in 1565 and established a Spanish settlement. He was greeted by hostile Muslims opposing a foreign invasion. His attempt to land on the island of Cebu resulted in the death of one of his soldiers, prompting him to explore another island and seek trade there.

Sailing south toward the island of Mindanao, Legazpi's fleet encountered high winds, which forced them to sail northward to the island of Bohol. There, he captured a vessel from Borneo whose Malay sailors informed the Spaniards that the natives inhabiting the region traded with people from Borneo and Indonesia. Arriving in Bohol, Legazpi noticed the hostility of the people. The Malayan servant explained that such hostility was due to the expeditions conducted by the Portuguese from the Moluccas Islands. In 1563, Portuguese fleets had arrived in Visayan waters and enslaved about 1,000 inhabitants. Legazpi, with the help of the Malayan sailor, explained to the people in Bohol that they were not Portuguese and that they had come to the islands to trade. Upon learning this, the chieftains became friendlier and welcomed the Spaniards.

== Ceremony ==
The Sandugo began with the arrival of Legazpi in Bohol in 1565 and the establishment of allegiance by Datu Sikatuna to the king of Spain. Legazpi and Sikatuna each made a cut on their left arm with a dagger and poured their blood into a cup filled with wine, which they both drank in honour of their friendship. The inscription at a monument in Tagbilaran City describes the event:

About the middle of March 1565, the fleet of Captain General Miguel López de Legazpi anchored along these shores. In the course of this visit, López de Legazpi entered into a blood compact with Datu Sikatuna for the purpose of insuring friendly relations between the Spaniards and Filipinos.

It added that the compact was performed as part of the tribal tradition.

Each of the two leaders made a small cut in his arm, drew a few drops of blood from the incision, mixed it with wine, and drank the goblet containing the blood of the other. Thus was the first bond of friendship between Filipinos and Spaniards.

In his report to the Spanish king, Philip II, López de Legazpi wrote:

It is observed in the following manner: one from each party draws two or three drops of blood from his own arm or breast and mixes them in the same cup, with water or wine. Then the mixture must be divided equally between two cups and neither person may depart until both cups are alike drained.

== Tradition ==
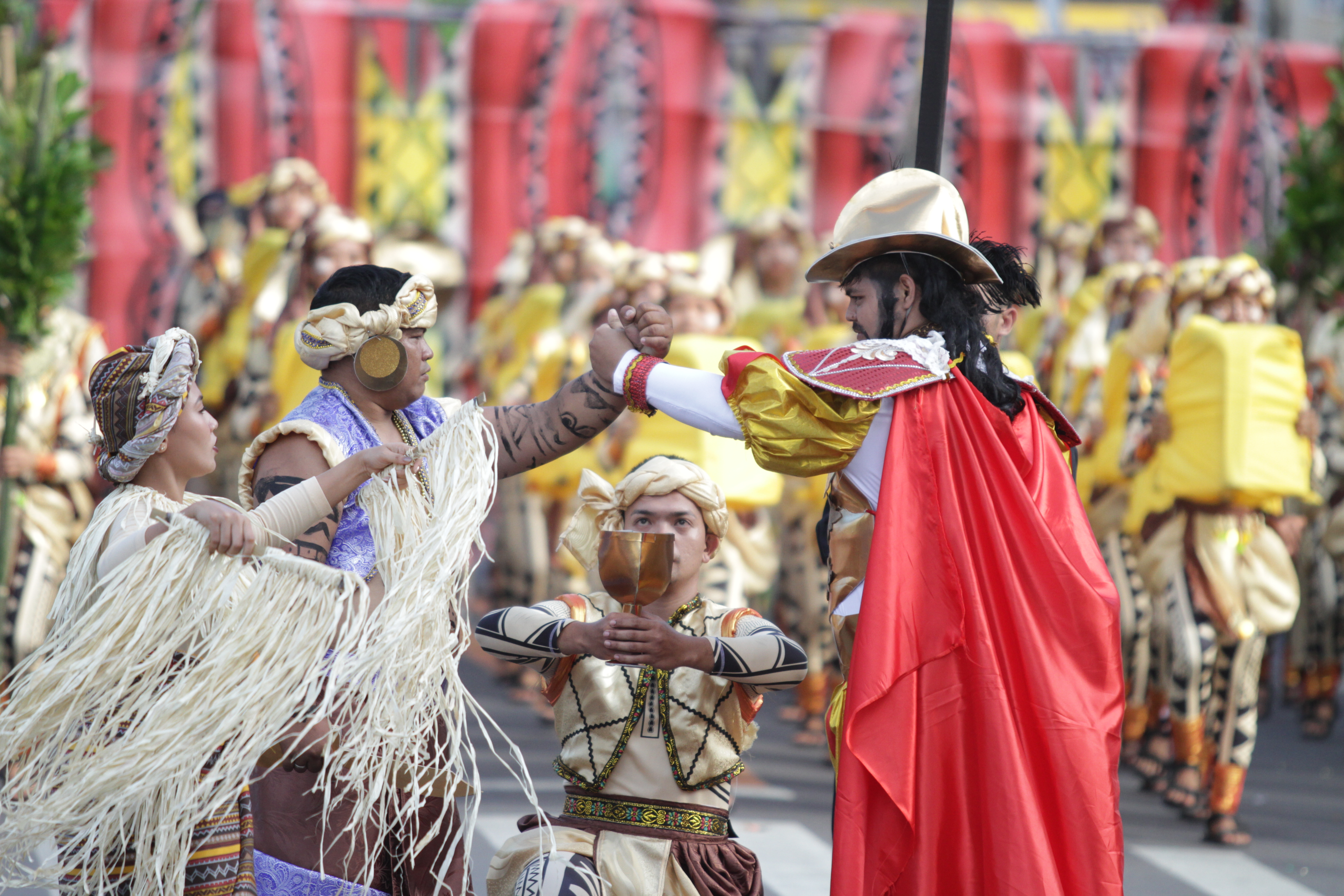
Sandugo reenactment

Traditionally, performing a blood compact preserved the bond of friendship between two tribes. This ceremony was the first treaty of friendship between the natives and the Spaniards in the Philippines. In its honor, the former President of the Philippines Elpidio Quirino established the Order of Sikatuna, a presidential decoration conferred upon politicians. Juan Luna, a Filipino painter, depicted the event in his painting entitled The Blood Compact (Spanish: El Pacto de Sangre) in 1886. It obtained the first prize in Paris in 1885 and at the Louisiana Purchase Exposition of St. Louis in 1904. During that period, it was important for tribes to perform the sandugo as part of the peace process.

A monument was constructed in Tagbilaran City by the Philippine Historical Committee and the National Historical Institute (NHI). In 2005, the NHI delisted the site, as the actual location of the historical blood compact remains to be resolved. In April 2024, the erroneous site underwent structural dismantling, paving the way for a phased enhancement of the authentic site in Villalimpia Loay, Bohol, which is currently in progress.

== See also ==
- History of the Philippines

== Publications ==
- Agoncillo, Teodoro A. – History of the Filipino People. Garotech Publishing, 1990 (8th edition)
- Arcila, José S. – Rizal and the Emergence of the Philippine Nation. 2001 revised edition
- Constantino, Renato. – The Philippines: A Past Revisited. Tala Publishing Series, 1975
- Corpuz, Onofre D. – The Roots of the Filipino Nation. 1989
- Scott, William Henry. – Barangay: Sixteenth-Century Philippine Culture and Society. AdMU: 1994
- Zaide, Gregorio F. – Great Filipinos in History: An Epic of Filipino Greatness in War and Peace. Verde Bookstore, 1970
- Zaide, Gregorio. – Dagohoy: Champion of Philippine Freedom. Manila: Enriquez, Alduan and Co., 1941
