= Bohol Business Park =

- Central business district
- Country: Philippines
- Region: Central Visayas
- Province: Bohol
- City: Tagbilaran City

Area
  - Total: 21 ha (52 acres)

Bohol Business Park (also known as BBP), is a 21-hectare (52-acre) under-construction mixed-use master-planned central business district and development in Tagbilaran City, Bohol, Philippines. Built within the former grounds of the Tagbilaran City Airport, the business park will soon integrate businesses, information technology hubs, commercial, and entertainment facilities.

== History ==
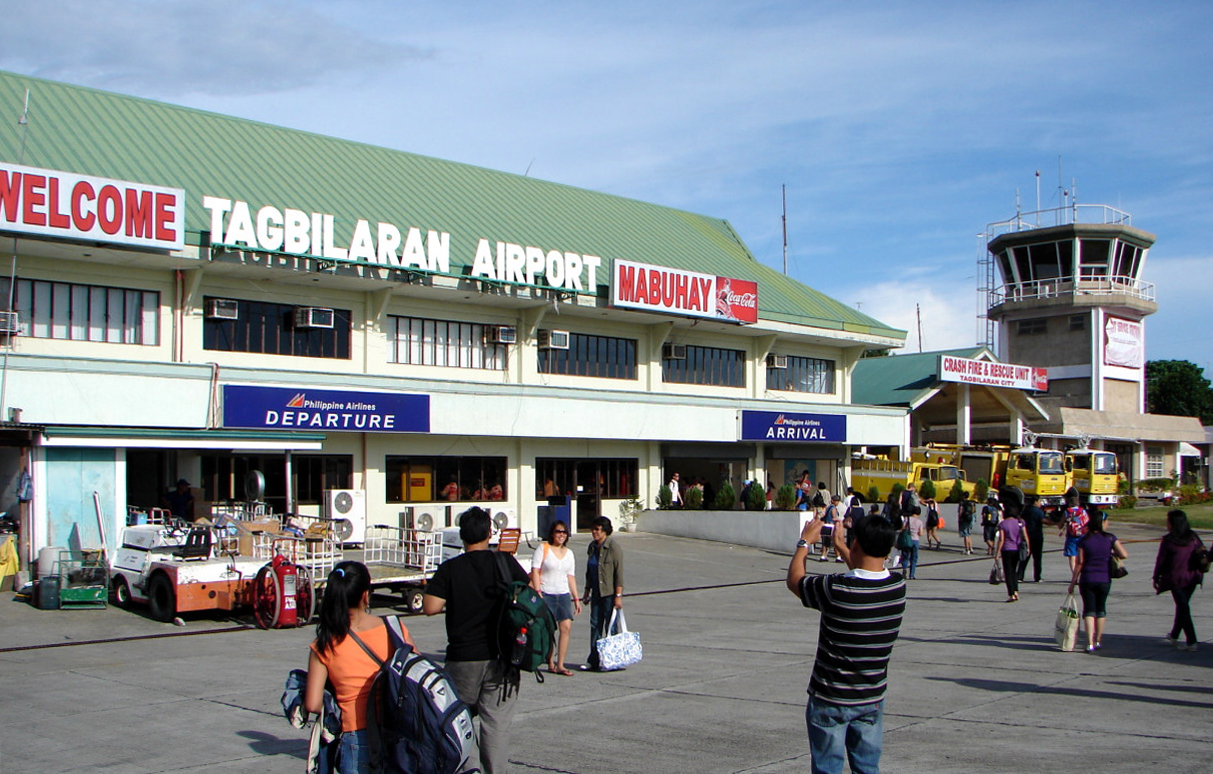
The old Tagbilaran Airport terminal, where a BPO facility currently now is situated.

Since the 1960s, the Tagbilaran Airport has been the sole airport operating in Bohol, with Philippine Airlines operating two-to-three flights per day. In the 2000s and 2010s, the airport reached its limit capacity and became congested. A proposal was made on creating a new airport in Panglao, in order to replace the congested airport. Construction of the new airport began in 2015, and would later be inaugurated in November 27, 2018. In that day, flights are then moved to the new Bohol-Panglao International Airport, and the Tagbilaran City Airport would later be closed.

Before the closure of the Tagbilaran Airport, plans to convert the airport into a business park began. In 2017, former Tagbilaran City mayor Baba Yap made a proposal to convert the airport into a business park once operations in the airport closed. The business park was planned to cater IT businesses, commercial spaces and entertainment centers including a convention center and a coliseum.

Plans of redeveloping the former airport did not come about until 2022. A public-private partnership venture would later be introduced in developing the new airport. Megaworld, a Philippine real-estate developer, proposed to establish a township in the airport but later dropped due to the runway cut of the lot is too slim for the project. Sagility, a US-based BPO firm, became the first locator of the business park, which is expected to employ some 3,000 Boholano nurses.

== Developments ==
=== Entertainment ===
The Bohol International Convention Center is a proposed 2-hectare convention center that will be situated in the Bohol Business Park. The convention center will soon accommodate 12,000 people. In 2022, the convention center received a ₱50 million budget from Senator Imee Marcos, through the Department of Public Works and Highways (DPWH).
