= Cubero =

Cubero is a surname. Notable people with the surname include:

- Vicente Aguilar Cubero (1808–1861), Costa Rican politician
- Edwin Cubero (1924–2000), Costa Rican footballer
- Fabián Cubero (born 1978), Argentine footballer
- Felisa Núñez Cubero (1924–2017), Spanish physicist
- Jaime Cubero (1926–1998), Brazilian intellectual, journalist, educator and activist
- Jhonny Cubero (born 1976), Costa Rican footballer
- Jonathan Cubero (born 1994), Uruguayan footballer
- Jorge Cubero (born 1992), Spanish former cyclist
- José Cubero Sánchez El Yiyo (1964–1985), Spanish bullfighter
- José Ignacio Cubero (born 1974), Basque lawyer, legal scholar and professor of law
- José María Movilla Cubero (born 1975), Spanish footballer
- José Miguel Cubero (born 1987), Costa Rican footballer
- Linda Garcia Cubero (born 1958), first Hispanic woman to graduate from any U.S. military service academy
- Pedro Cubero (1645-c. 1697), Spanish priest and world traveler
- Ruben A. Cubero (born 1939), United States Air Force brigadier general
- Sergio Cubero (born 1999), Spanish footballer
- Vicente T. Cubero, also known as Captain Francisco Salazar (1911–1942), Filipino World War II guerrilla leader
- Tanja Jasmin Cubero (born 2003), Icelandic former footballer
