= Felisa =

Felisa is a given name and surname. Notable people with the name include:

given name

- Felisa Batacan, Filipino journalist and writer of crime and mystery fiction
- Felisa Martín Bravo (1898–1979), Spanish physicist and meteorologist
- Felisa Miceli (born 1952), Argentine economist
- Felisa Núñez Cubero (1924–2017), Spanish physicist
- Felisa Rincón de Gautier (1897–1994), Puerto Rican politician
- Felisa Wolfe-Simon, American microbial geobiologist and biogeochemist

surname

- Amedeo Felisa (born 1946), CEO of Ferrari and Aston Martin
