= Nestor Principe =

Filipino activist, writer and martial arts instructor

- Born: March 15, 1945
- Died: May 7, 1973 (aged 28)
- Occupation(s): Activist, Martial Arts Instructor
- Awards: Honored at the Bantayog ng mga Bayani wall of remembrance

Nestor Labastilla Principe, also called "Ka Wadi" (March 15, 1945 – May 7, 1973) was a Filipino activist, writer, and martial arts instructor best known for his student activism at the Lyceum of the Philippines, his community mobilization work among the poor communities of Manila's port ara, and for his martyrdom on May 7, 1973, when he was killed and beheaded by elements of the Philippine Constabulary during Ferdinand Marcos' Martial Law regime.

In the years after Marcos's removal, on November 30, 2018, Principe's name was engraved on the Wall of Remembrance of the Bantayog ng mga Bayani, which honors the martyrs and heroes that fought against the Martial Law regime of Ferdinand Marcos.

== Early life and Sikaran practice ==
Although Principe was born in Tagbilaran in the province of Bohol in the Visayas, his family soon settled in Caloocan in Metro Manila, where the young Nestor went to school. The part of Caloocan where the Principe family had settled was one ruled by gangs and rogue police officers, so he became interested in martial arts. He soon earned a black belt in Sikaran, a Filipino kickfighting style akin to Shotokan-style Karate.

At a 1965 International Martial Arts Exhibition, Principe was recruited by a Malaysian government minister to serve as a bodyguard and martial arts instructor. Principe accepted, and, along with three other Filipino practitioners became responsible for introducing the art of Sikaran to Malaysia.

== Life overseas ==
After working in Malaysia, Principe went on to travel throughout the world, visiting Thailand, India, Nepal and Pakistan, the Middle East, North Africa and Europe. He is reported to have claimed working to clear land mines in Israel. He travelled with hippie friends, taking odd jobs as a worker or as a martial arts instructor, and was at a protest rally in Trafalgar Square when he heard about the events of the First Quarter Storm. This inspired him to hitchhike his way back to the Philippines, where he went back to college and became a student activist.

== Activist work ==
Principe went to the Lyceum of the Philippines to take up a second undergraduate degree, choosing to enrol in journalism. He wrote literary pieces during this time, two of which – “Goodbye Manuel” and “Wadi is also a river” – were published in the Philippines Free Press.

== Death and legacy ==
On May 7, 1973, Principe was killed in Kabayan, Benguet by elements of the Philippine Constabulary, who removed his head from his body and presented it to their commanding officer. The officer ordered them to return the head to be buried with the body, but no witnesses have confirmed whether this order was indeed followed. The residents of Kabayan were so aghast at the atrocity that they performed a ritual to cleanse their community of the desecration before they buried Principe's body in the mountains of Benguet.

On November 30, 2018, Principe's name was engraved on the Wall of Remembrrance of the Bantayog ng mga Bayani, which honors the martyrs and heroes that fought against the Martial Law regime of Ferdinand Marcos.

== See also ==
- Martial Law under Ferdinand Marcos
