= Tagbilaran Airport =

Former airport in Central Visayas, Philippines

Tagbilaran Airport Tugpahanan sa Tagbilaran Paliparan ng Tagbilaran
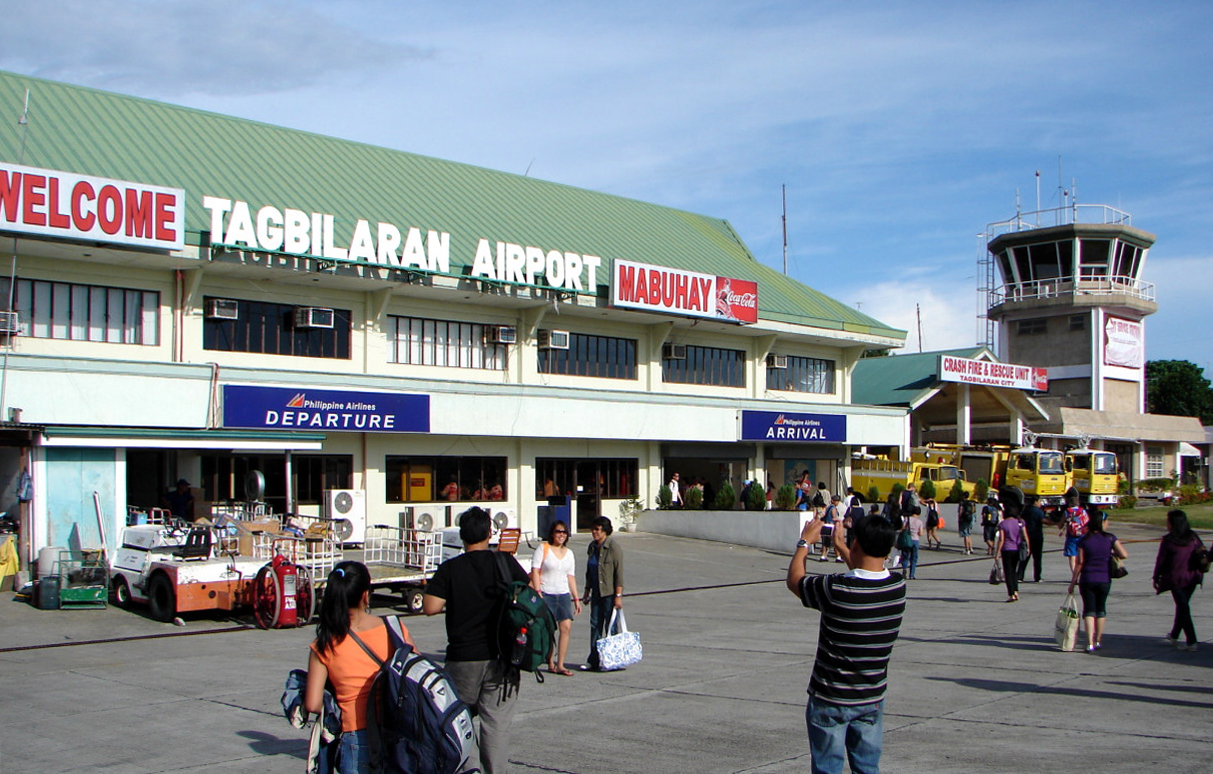
- The terminal building in 2008
- IATA: TAG; ICAO: RPVT

Summary
- Airport type: Defunct
- Owner/Operator: Civil Aviation Authority of the Philippines
- Serves: Tagbilaran
- Closed: November 27, 2018
- Elevation AMSL: 12 m (39 ft)
- Coordinates: 09°39′50.69″N 123°51′11.69″E

Map
- Location in the Philippines

Runways
Direction	Length		Surface
Direction	m	ft	Surface
~~17/35~~	1,779	5,837	Asphalt (Closed)

Tagbilaran Airport (IATA: TAG, ICAO: RPVT) was an airport that served the general area of Tagbilaran, the capital city of the province of Bohol in the Philippines. The airport was built and opened in the 1960s, until it was closed for scheduled passenger services on November 27, 2018, after being replaced by the new Bohol–Panglao International Airport located in the nearby Municipality of Panglao.

== History ==
Tagbilaran Airport was built and inaugurated in the 1960s. Prior to 1995, Philippine Airlines was the sole airline operating flights from Tagbilaran Airport to Ninoy Aquino International Airport and Mactan–Cebu International Airport from Tagbilaran Airport with a frequency of 2 to 3 flights a day. The airport formerly served flights from Mactan–Cebu International Airport until these flights were cancelled due to the introduction of ferry services between Cebu and Bohol.

In the 2000s and 2010s, the airport reached capacity and was congested. The airport was not capable of operating during nighttime. A new airport in Panglao Island was planned to replace Tagbilaran Airport. The feasibility study for the new airport project started in 2000 and was approved in 2012.

The 2013 Bohol earthquake caused damage including the collapse of a ceiling in the control tower. Operations were suspended for three hours but later resumed.

=== Closure and proposed redevelopment ===
On November 27, 2018, the airport was closed for scheduled passenger services from 18:00 onwards, being replaced by Bohol–Panglao International Airport with advanced and modern facilities, and having the capability to operate during nighttime, enabling 24-hour operations a day. A month later, in December 2018, the site of the former airport was eyed to be redeveloped into a mixed-use development, initially dubbed as the Bohol Business Park.

In October 2020, a resolution was approved by the infrastructure development committee of the Central Visayas Regional Development Council asking the Department of Public Works and Highways to authorize a study for a possible connector infrastructure or viaduct highway connecting the third Panglao-Tagbilaran bridge to Manga, a barangay in the north of the city, with an exit going to the airport. A plan was also unveiled by Governor Arthur Yap for the airport to become a creative industry hub.

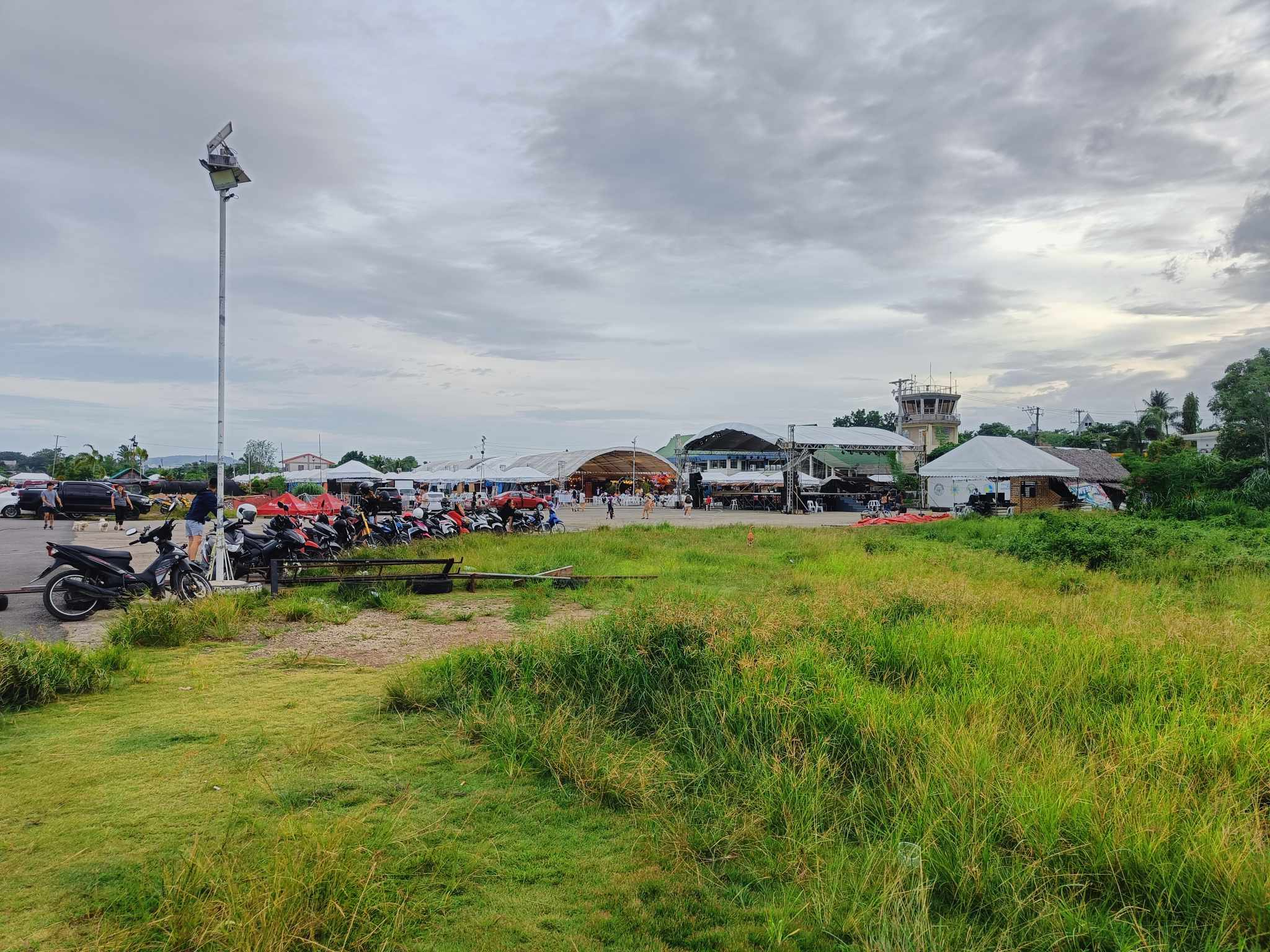
Tagbilaran Airport terminal and tarmac in 2023

In July 2021, the Tagbilaran City council raised concerns over the safety and cleanliness of the defunct airport, citing the accumulation of garbage in the runway, some vehicles that were passing directly through the runway, and other safety issues. Months prior, the airport site hosted various events including a mobile market and the month-long Ubi Festival.

A campaign rally of then-Vice President Leni Robredo and then-incumbent Senator Kiko Pangilinan for their presidential and vice-presidential candidaties was held at the airport's runway on April 1, 2022, as part of their campaign for the 2022 general elections.

In December 2023, Boholano Governor Aris Aumentado and the Bohol Provincial Government discussed with Civil Aviation Authority of the Philippines officials to create a one unified plan, through a joint venture for the use of the old airport. If approved, the area will be made into an IT park development that will especially accommodate BPO locators, and many companies have already expressed their plans into investing in the region.

==== Bohol Business Park ====
On May 15, 2024, Governor Aris Aumentado, Vice-Governor Dionisio Victor A. Balite and Mayor Jane Cajes Yap led the groundbreaking for development of the old Tagbilaran Airport into the new Bohol Business Park. The financial centre will generate 3,000 jobs and attract more BPO companies.

== See also ==
- List of airports in the Philippines
