= Sikaran =

Filipino martial art

Sikaran is a Filipino Martial Art that mostly involves foot fighting. As Sikaran is a general term for kicking which is also used as the name of the kicking aspects of other Filipino Martial Arts. Although originating independently, this style is taught in conjunction with Kali and Dumog.

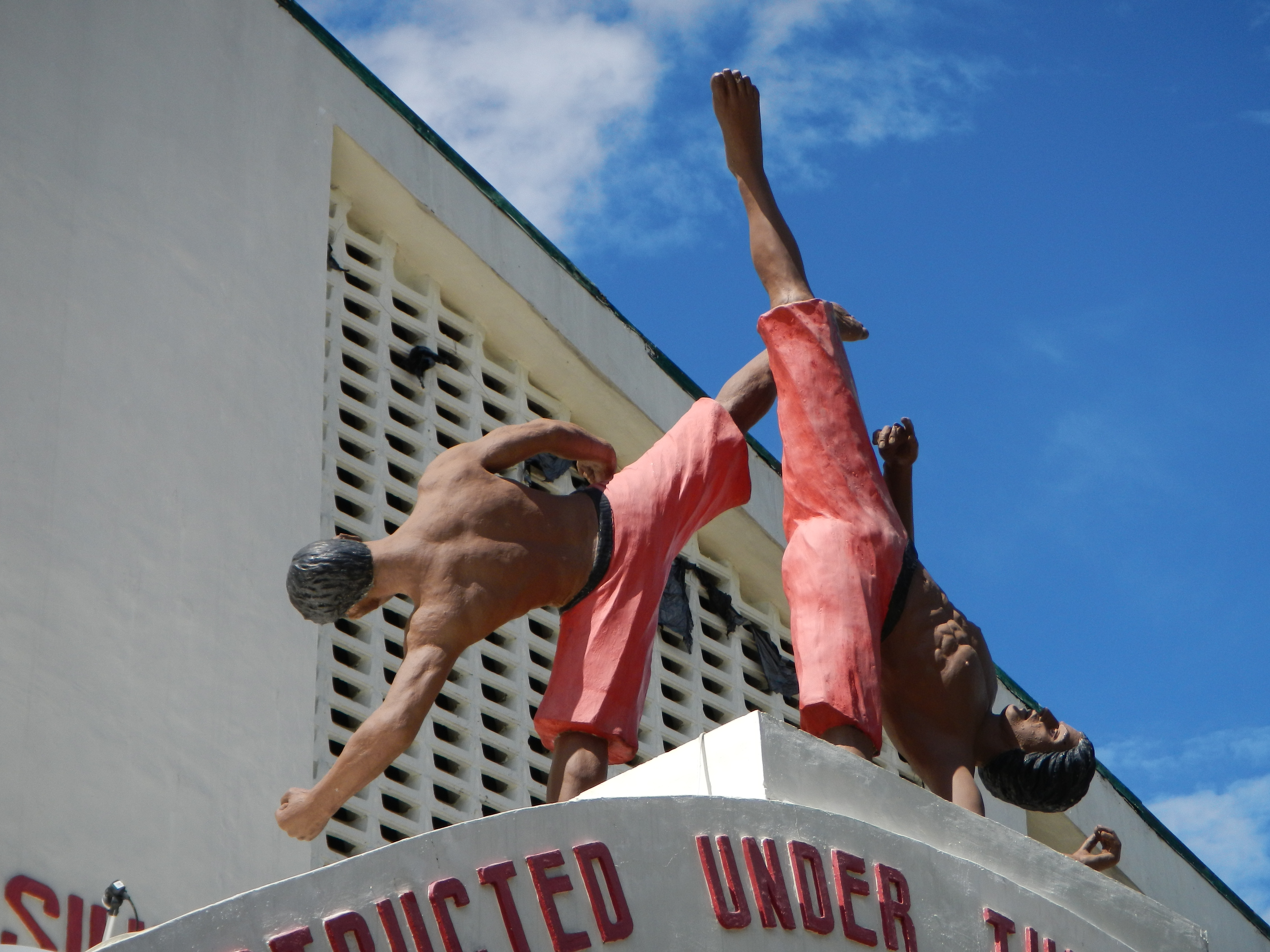
Sikaran statue

== Definition ==
Sikaran comes from the root word sikad which means kick in Tagalog, Kapampangan (e.g. sikaran daka - "I'm going to kick you"), as well as Cebuano (e.g. "sikaran tika").

== History ==
Sikaran is a simple but intense martial art game that originated from the town of Baras, in the province of Rizal. According to the forefathers of Baras, it had been practiced long before the Spanish came to the Philippines in the 16th century.

It is noted that like most Filipino martial arts, Sikaran has no written history as traditional Filipino knowledge is passed orally from generation to generation.

Like many Filipino martial arts styles, it has been endangered as it does not have as many practitioners as the more mainstream martial arts. Like Modern Arnis, in the mid-20th century, it had to adapt certain structural aspects of the more well known art of karate like the belting system, choreographed forms or katas and uniforms to make it more appealing other Filipinos and be more accepted internationally.

== Fighting Style ==
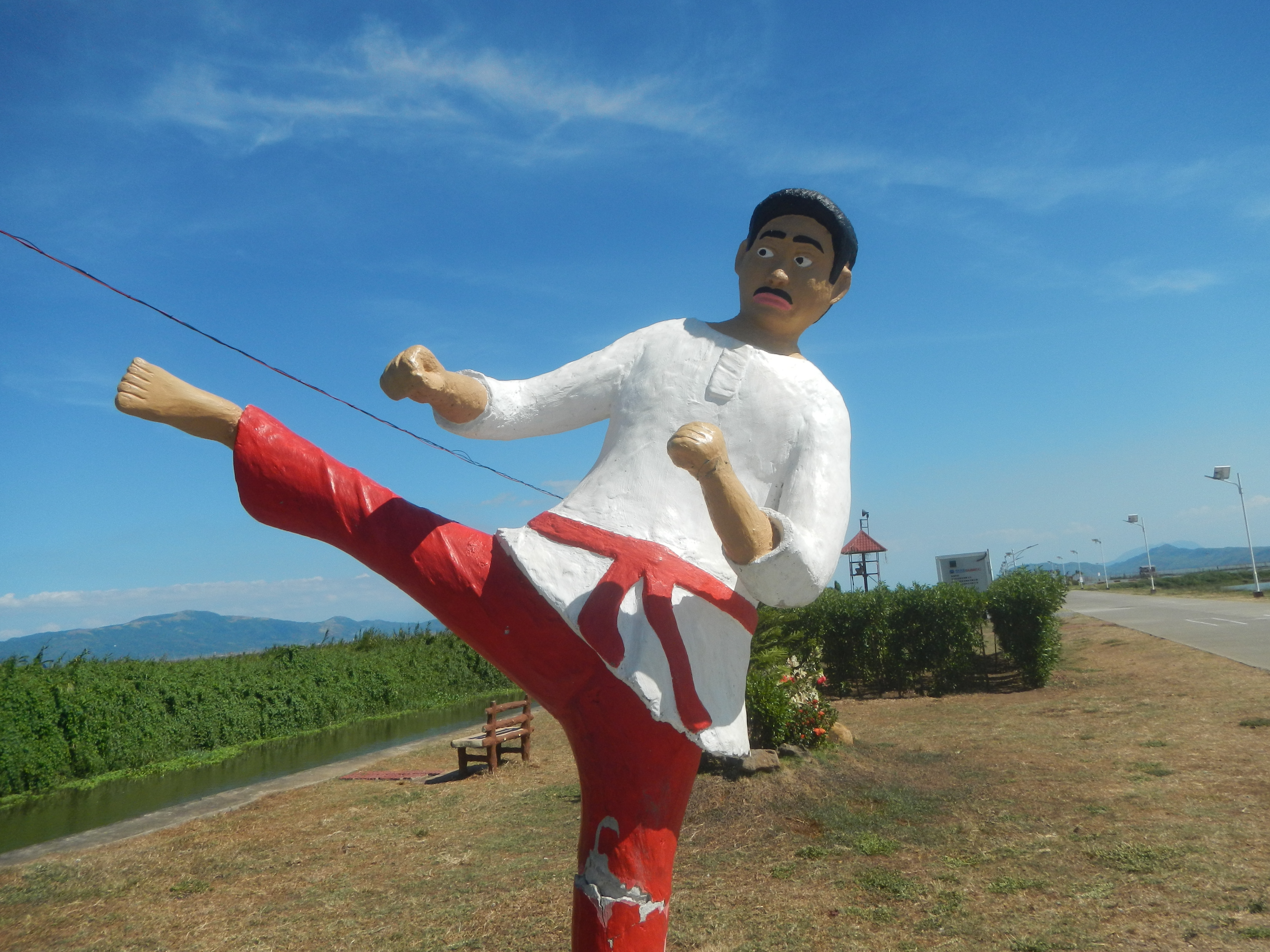
Sikaran statue

Sikaran has its own distinct kicking styles. The signature Biakid kick is executed by pivoting to the back in a complete turn, much like a spinning hook kick or a reverse round house in other martial arts styles and targets the side or back of the head while the practitioner is in mid to punching range.

The degree of effectiveness subscribes to two classifications: "panghilo" (paralyzing blow) and "pamatay" or lethal kick. Obviously, the first aimed at less vital parts of the physique, while the target of the second includes the heart, neck, head, groin, and spine, all highly vulnerable parts.

Footage from the Last Man Standing UK TV series episode on Sikaran (YouTube link, uploaded by the Sikaran group featured) shows how the style practiced in the province is done differently from Korean Taekwondo and Japanese Karate. There have been questions on the art of Sikaran as being native to the Philippines or being borrowed from Karate and Tae Kwon Do, but as can be seen in the Last Man Standing footage, to the farmers watching the sport and cheering on the sidelines, it is simply an ordinary sight common to their particular village, much like Sabong (cockfighting) is in the rest of the Philippines.

== Sport ==
Sikaran utilizes only the feet as a rule for sport, and the hands are only used for blocking, leg sweeps and throwing an opponent is also a part of the martial art. The player uses his legs 90% of the time and his hands 10%, and only for blocking or parrying blows. Violation of this injunction, especially in tournaments, is grounds for disqualification.

The entry of Sikaran in tournaments, particularly those of international calibre, presaged certain modifications, if innovations, of its original rules, like the setting of a time limit and widening of the fighting area into twice the size required of the original arena, and the wearing of armor for safety reasons as it is played full contact and bare-chested with no armour or groinguard in the original province, as the Filipino martial artists from more modest areas generally had no such access to Western accessories.

== Global Expansion ==
Sikaran began growing globally after the participation in International Martial Arts tournaments in the middle to late 1960s, as a result of which four senior practitioners, including Martial Law era activist hero Nestor Principe, were recruited to teach the art in Malaysia.

Over the last several decades Sikaran has spread across the globe where Filipino practitioners have established schools. Global locations include America, Australia, Saudi Arabia and Canada.

The most well known organisations include but are not limited to the World Sikaran Arnis Brotherhood, Global Sikaran Federation.

The World Sikaran Arnis Brotherhood was founded by Melton C. Geronimo who was a former Lt. COL of the Philippine Air Force and Mayor of Baras. He received his Grand Master ship from the Asian Karate Association (composed of Japan, Korea, China and the Philippines) in 1966. He is often credited for modernising the curriculum to include the karate inspired belting systems and forms.

Hari Osias Banaag is the founder of the Global Sikaran Federation and is a diplomat for the Traditional game. Hari Osias Bannag is known for his expansion of the style globally and efforts to differentiate it from other martial art styles. He recently attended and was warmly received at the UNESCO Collective Consultation Meeting on the Preservation and the Promotion of Traditional Sports and Game (TSG) and is an appointed member of Ad hoc Advisory Committee Traditional Sports and Games, UNESCO(TSG)Ref

Sikaran and its hybrid styles (Sikaran Kickboxing and the Australian variant Saboong Kickboxing) should not be confused with Kali-Sikaran which is a modern Filipino Martial art, that is not related to the style originating from Rizal. Kali-Sikaran is more closely related to the other weapons based variants of Filipino Martial Arts.

Whilst Sikaran participants have shown respectable results in Tae Kwon Do, Sikaran and kickboxing competitions in the past, in recent years some practitioners have ventured into MMA and have mixed the style with other martial arts and is a notable evolution of the sport.
