= Bohol–Panglao International Airport =

Airport in Central Visayas, Philippines

Bohol–Panglao International Airport Tugpahanang Pangkalibutanon sa Bohol–Panglao Paliparang Pandaigdig ng Bohol–Panglao
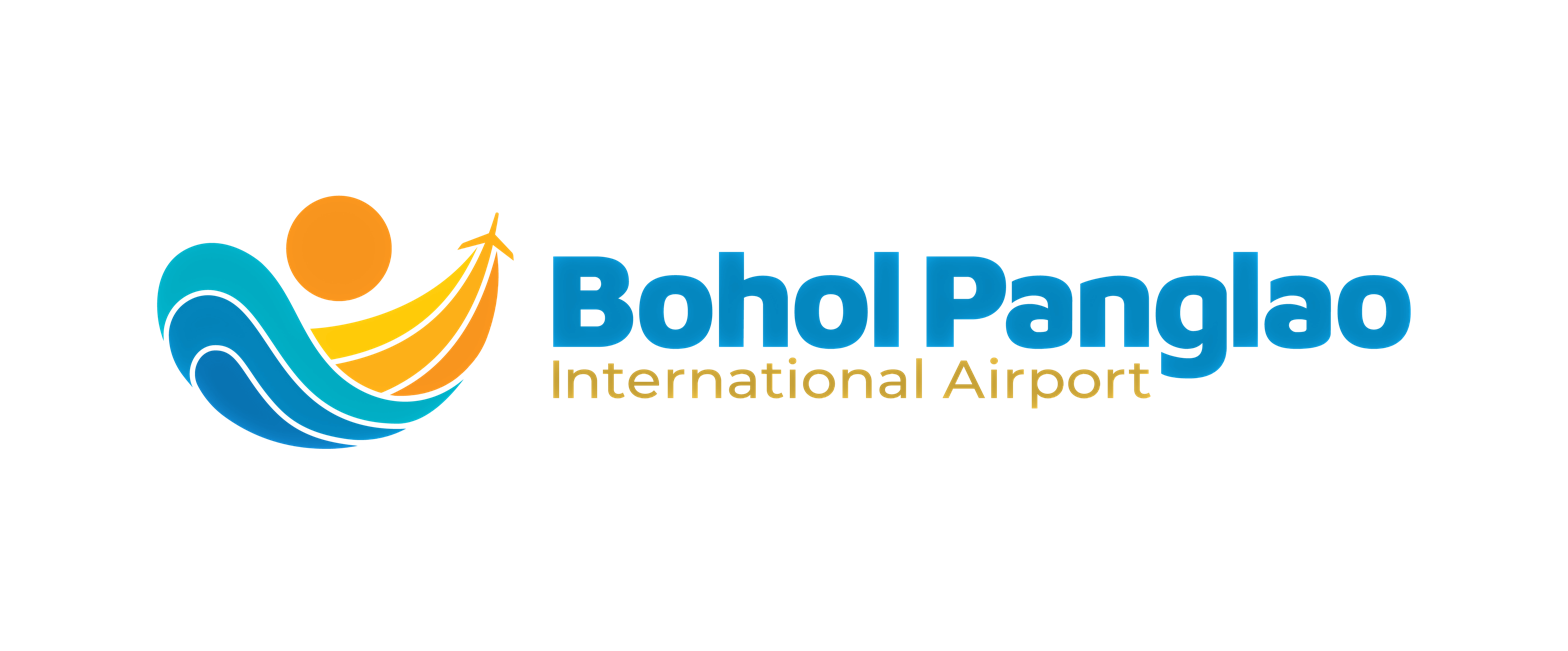

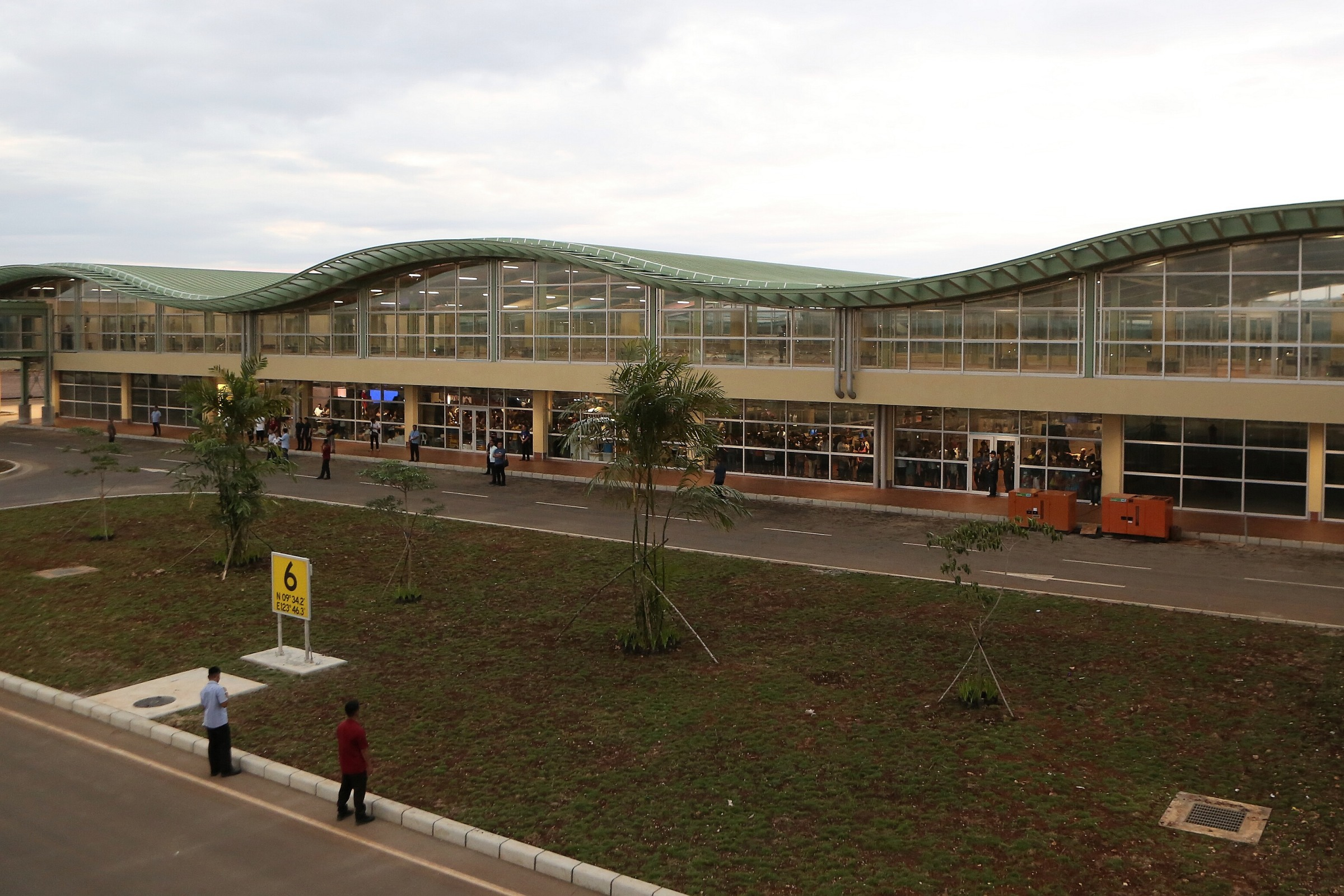
- IATA: TAG; ICAO: RPSP

Summary
- Airport type: Public
- Owner: Civil Aviation Authority of the Philippines
- Operator: Aboitiz InfraCapital, Inc.
- Serves: Bohol
- Location: Barangay Tawala, Panglao, Panglao Island, Bohol, Philippines
- Opened: November 28, 2018; 7 years ago
- Time zone: PHT (UTC+08:00)
- Elevation AMSL: 13 m (43 ft)
- Coordinates: 9°34′N 123°46.5′E
- Website: https://www.facebook.com/boholpanglaointernationalairportofficial/

Map
- Location within Visayas Location within Philippines

Runways
Direction	Length		Surface
Direction	m	ft	Surface
03/21	2,500	8,202	Asphalt

Statistics (2022)
- Passengers: 1,199,283 ▲382.42%
- Aircraft movements: 8,082 ▲84.94%
- Cargo (in kg): 3,513,730 ▲3.43%
- Source: CAAP

Bohol–Panglao International Airport (IATA: TAG, ICAO: RPSP), also known as New Bohol International Airport or Panglao Island Airport, is an international airport on Panglao Island in the province of Bohol, Philippines. The airport opened on November 28, 2018 after decades of planning and three years of construction, replacing Tagbilaran Airport to support Bohol's increased passenger traffic due to tourism. The airport serves as the gateway to Tagbilaran and the rest of mainland Bohol for domestic air travellers. It also is less than an hour's flight from Mactan–Cebu International Airport, which is a gateway to central Philippines for international tourists.

Dubbed as the first eco-airport in the Philippines and the country's green gateway, the airport is located at a 230-hectare (570-acre) site in Barangay Tawala in Panglao.

While the airport is billed as an international airport – with Jeju Air, Asiana Airlines, Air Busan, Jin Air, Air Seoul, Qingdao Airlines and Philippine Airlines – it is classified as Class 1 principal domestic airport by the Civil Aviation Authority of the Philippines.

== History ==
=== Planning and funding ===
The first feasibility study of the airport was conducted in 2000 during the Estrada administration. On September 4, 2012, President Benigno Aquino III, head of the NEDA Board of the Philippines, approved a resolution giving the green light for the construction of the airport. The proposed airport was to be funded through Official Development Assistance (ODA) instead of the Public-Private Partnership (PPP), an infrastructure-building program of the government of the Philippines wherein the private sector may participate in any of the schemes authorized by its build-operate-transfer law.

On March 27, 2013, the Japan International Cooperation Agency signed an agreement with the Republic of the Philippines to build the Bohol–Panglao International Airport at the cost of JPY10.78 billion, under the name "New Bohol Airport Construction and Sustainable Environment Protection Project". The signing signaled the roll out for the construction of a new airport in the province of Bohol at an island adjacent to Tagbilaran Airport. Despite the location of the airport, which is just outside of Tagbilaran, it adapted the IATA code: TAG from the old airport, which was located in the heart of Tagbilaran.

=== Construction and opening ===
Initially, the airport's cost was pegged at ₱4.8 billion pesos to build but was later increased.

On June 9, 2014, six Japanese firms submitted bids for construction of the proposed airport at a cost of ₱7.14 billion to be funded from official development assistance (ODA) loan from the Japan International Cooperation Agency. On December 15, the Department of Transportation and Communications started its search for bidders to bid out for the operations and maintenance (and future extension) of the airport under a concession model.

Following the selection of Japanese Airport Consultants (JAC) for the design and consultancy work on the project, and the consortium of Chiyoda Corporation and Mitsubishi Corporation as the prime contractors, construction started on June 22, 2015. In its initial plan, the project was expected to finish in 2016, but was repeatedly delayed. Prior to the 2018 opening, the airport was slated to be completed by 2021.

Philippines AirAsia operated a special flight using its Airbus A320 to the new airport, becoming the first airline to land at the airport hours before its inauguration on November 27, 2018. The airport was then inaugurated by then President Rodrigo Duterte on the same day. The first commercial flight to land was Cebu Pacific Flight 619, an Airbus A320 from Ninoy Aquino International Airport in Manila, which landed at past 7:30 a.m. PST the following day.

The first international flight to land at the airport was a chartered Royal Air Philippines A320 flight from Hong Kong International Airport at 4:45 p.m. PST on September 30, 2019. Meanwhile, Jeju Air Flight 4407, a Boeing 737-800 from Incheon International Airport, landed as the first commercial international flight at the airport on November 21 at 11:28 a.m. PST.

=== Privatization ===
On March 7, 2018, Aboitiz InfraCapital Inc. submitted an unsolicited proposal to take over and upgrade the airport as well as Iloilo International Airport, Bacolod–Silay Airport, and Laguindingan Airport. The National Economic and Development Authority (NEDA) approved the proposal on December 3, 2019. After surpassing the Swiss challenge, Aboitiz announced on November 27, 2024, that they have been awarded the ₱4.53-billion, 30-year contract by the Department of Transportation (DOTr). Aboitiz took over the airport's operations on June 16, 2025.

== Structures and facilities ==
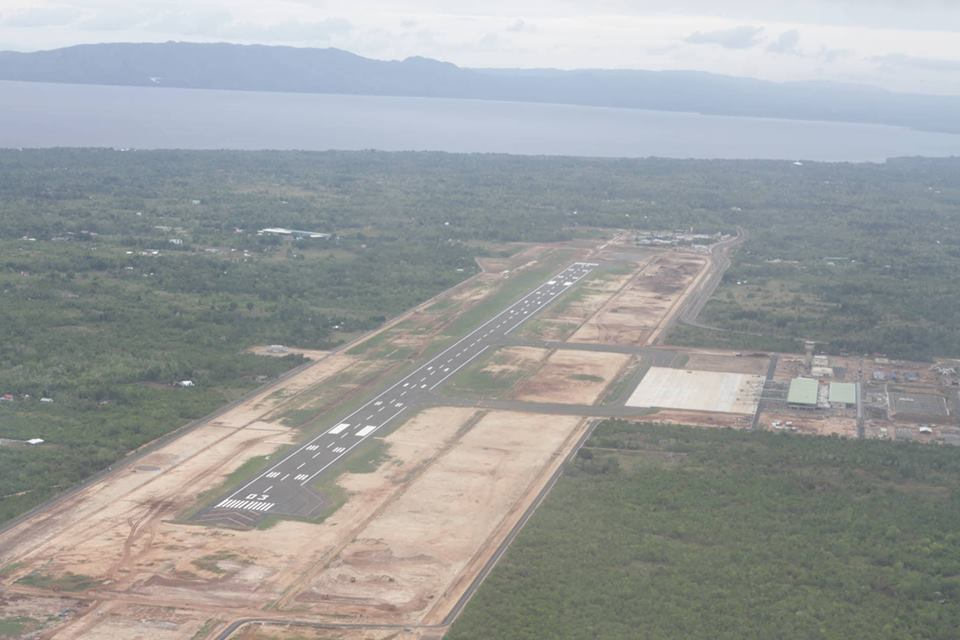
Aerial view of Bohol–Panglao International Airport.

=== Runway ===
The airport has a 2,500-meter (8,200 ft) asphalt runway that runs in a 030°/210° direction. Taxiways E3 and E4 serve as access to the apron from the runway. During construction, the runway was planned to be 2,000 meters (6,600 ft) long, later extended to 2,500 meters (8,200 ft). The runway is planned to be extended to 2,800 meters (9,200 ft).

To make the airport capable of night operations, an instrument landing system and other navigational equipment were installed in 2019.

=== Terminal and apron ===
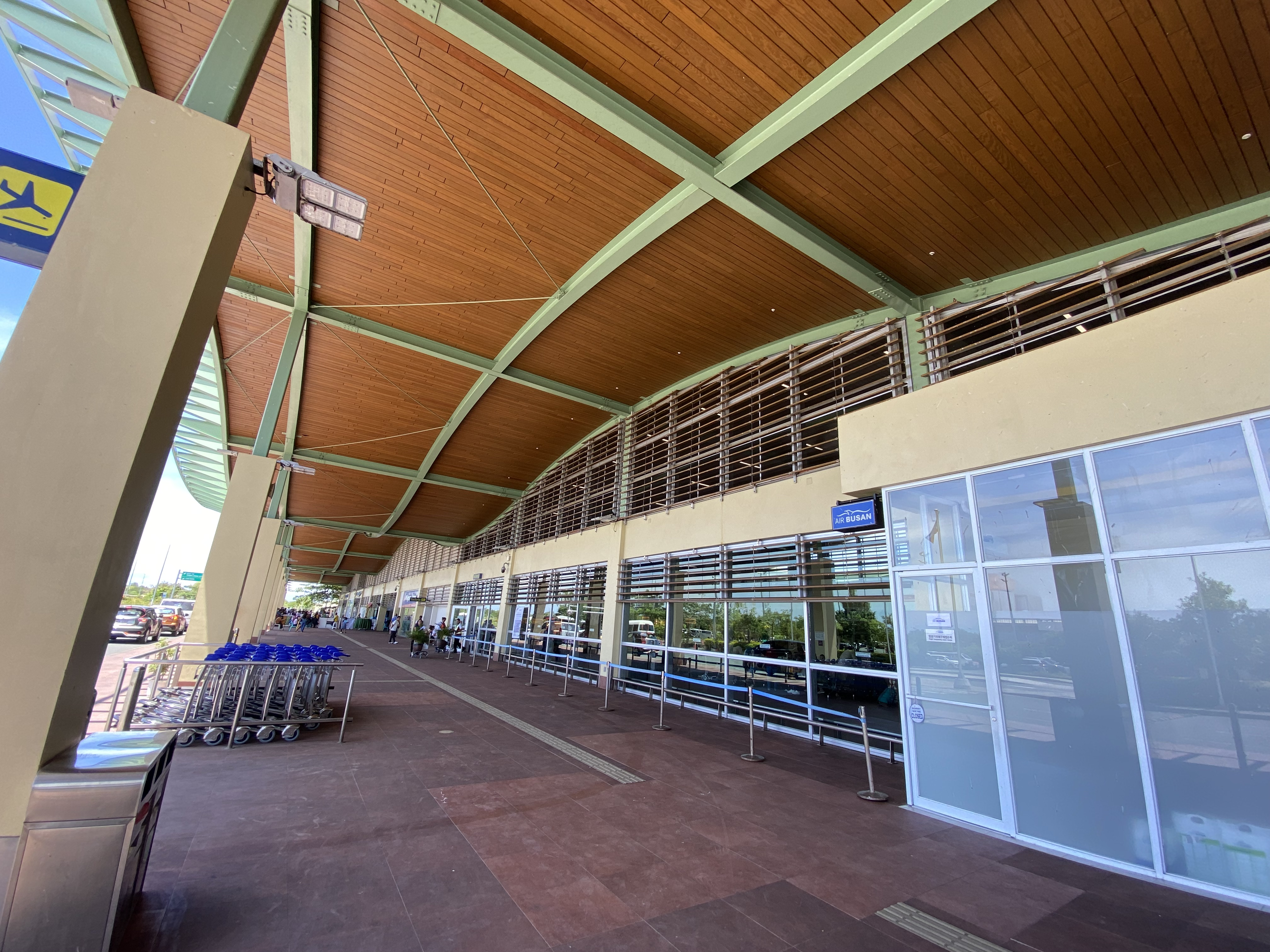
Terminal building entrance

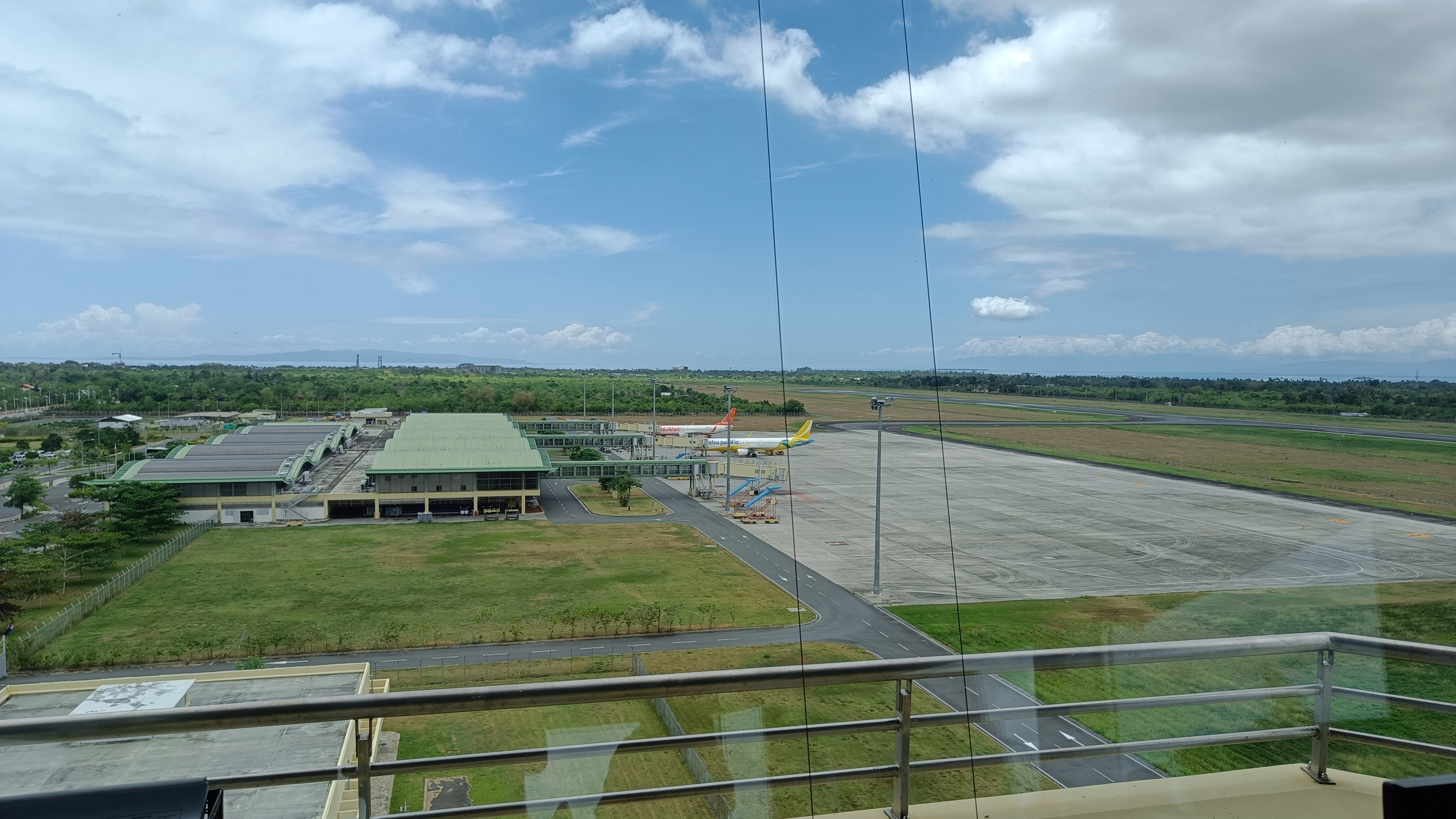
Airport terminal and apron

The airport has a two-level passenger terminal building with an area of 13,337 square meters (143,560 sq ft), designed to accommodate two million passengers annually. It uses natural ventilation and solar power for one-third of its power supply.

During construction, the original plan was to construct a single level for the terminal. In 2016, the Bohol provincial government pushed to install jet bridges for easier access, hence, a second level was constructed. The terminal also sports a wave roof design inspired by the Chocolate Hills.

Three jet bridges protude above a seven-bay concrete apron. The apron is capable of handling four parking bays for wide-body aircraft as large as the Boeing 777 and Airbus A330 or a maximum of seven parking bays for narrow-body aircraft like the Airbus A320 and A321.

== Airlines and destinations ==
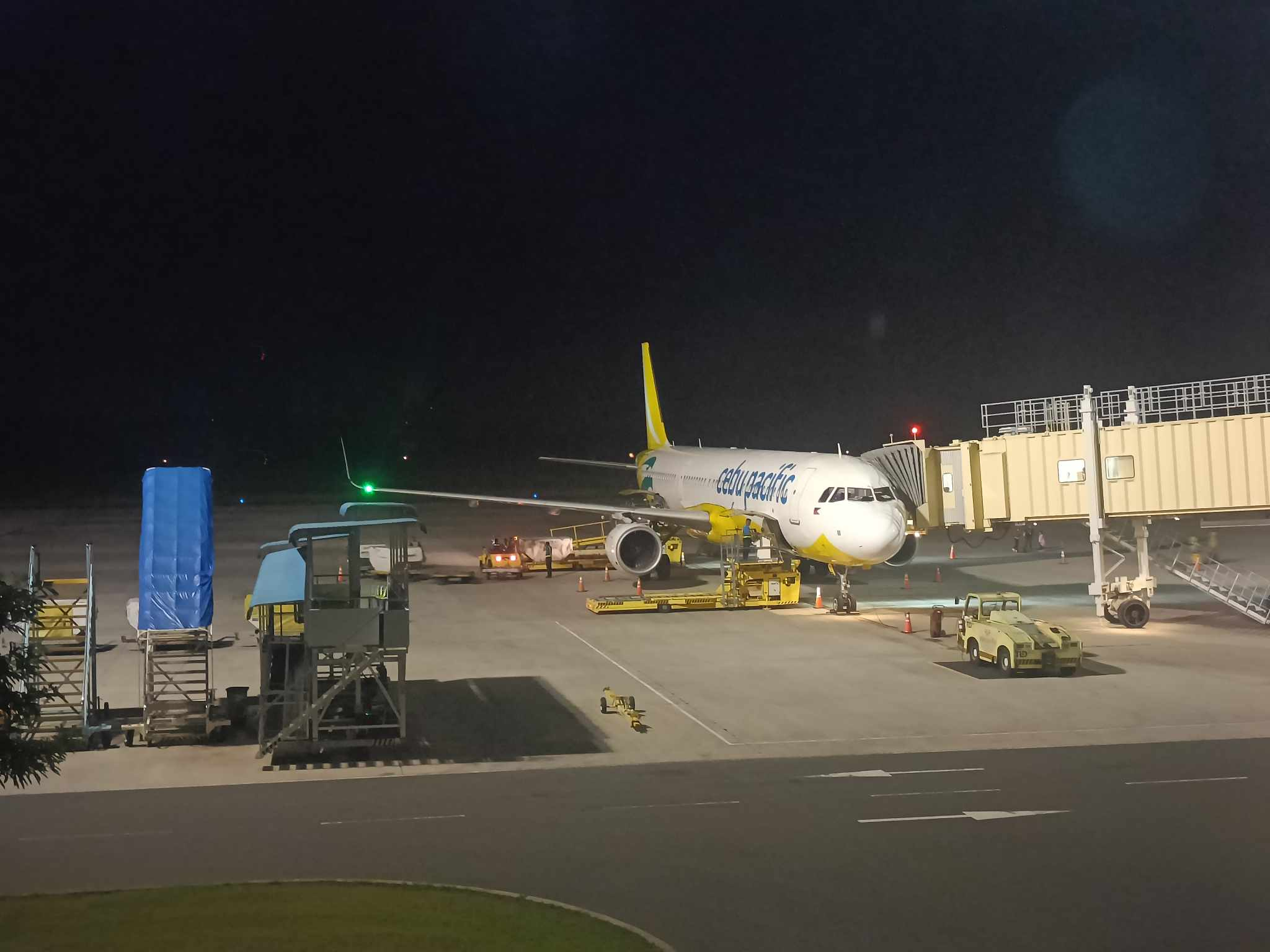
A Cebu Pacific Airbus A321-200 at night.

Airlines	Destinations
Cebgo	Davao, El Nido, Iloilo
Cebu Pacific	Clark, Manila
Jeju Air	Busan, Seoul–Incheon
Jin Air	Seoul–Incheon (resumes January 1, 2027)
PAL Express	Davao, Manila
Philippine Airlines	Manila

== Statistics ==
Data from Civil Aviation Authority of the Philippines (CAAP).

Year	Passenger movements				Aircraft movements				Cargo movements (in kg)			
Year	Domestic	International	Total	% change	Domestic	International	Total	% change	Domestic	International	Total	% change
2018 (Note: Data for December 1–31, 2018.)	90,708	7,287	97,995	Steady	892	80	972	Steady	695,500	63,078	758,578	Steady
2019	1,305,779	28,159	1,333,938	▲1,261.23	12,024	237	12,261	▲1,161.42	6,188,171	181,633	6,369,804	▲739.70
2020	288,558	19,712	308,270	▼76.89	4,352	158	4,510	▼63.22	2,474,981	—	2,474,981	▼61.15
2021	248,596	0	248,596	▼19.36	4,370	0	4,370	▼3.10	3,397,186	0	3,397,186	▲37.26
2022	1,143,543	55,740	1,199,283	▲382.42	7,700	382	8,082	▲84.94	3,513,730	—	3,513,730	▲3.43
2023	1,302,846	351,022	1,653,868	▲37.90	8,870	2,254	11,124	▲37.63	5,761,303	0	5,761,303	▲63.96

An em dash (—) is used when data from CAAP is not available.

== See also ==
- List of airports in the Philippines
