= Tagbilaran =

Capital city of Bohol, Philippines

Tagbilaran San José de Tagbilarán
- Component city
- City of Tagbilaran
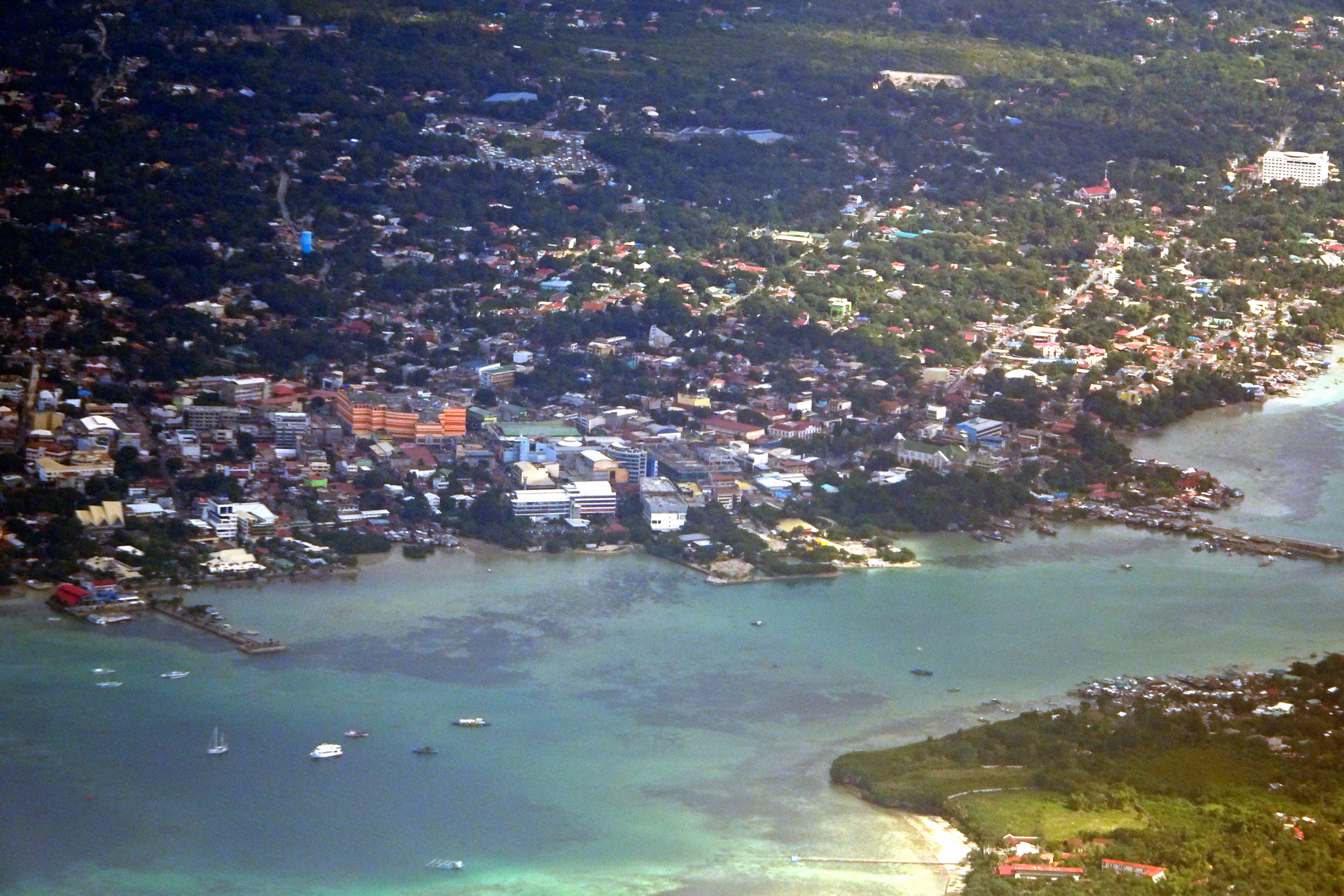
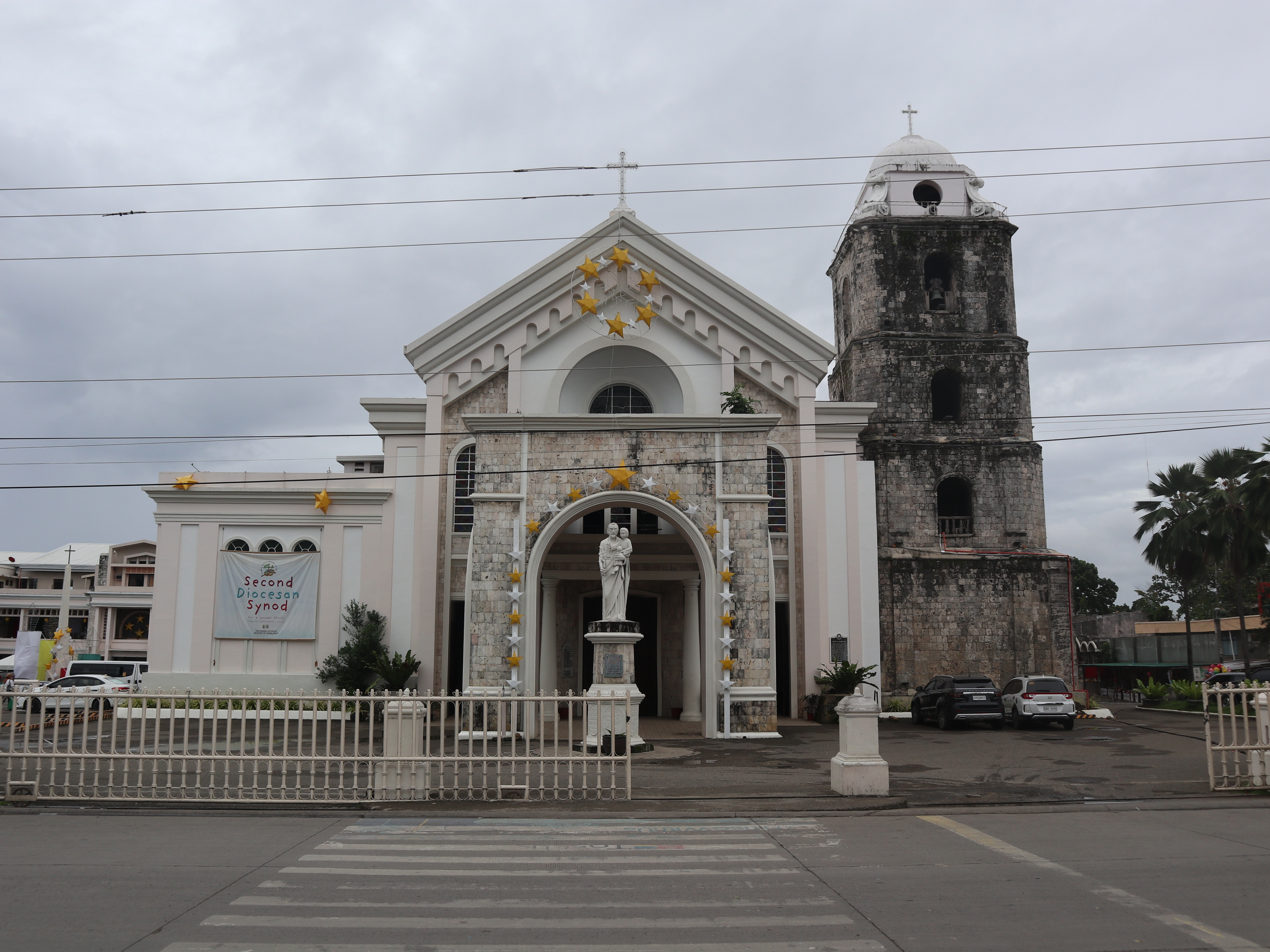
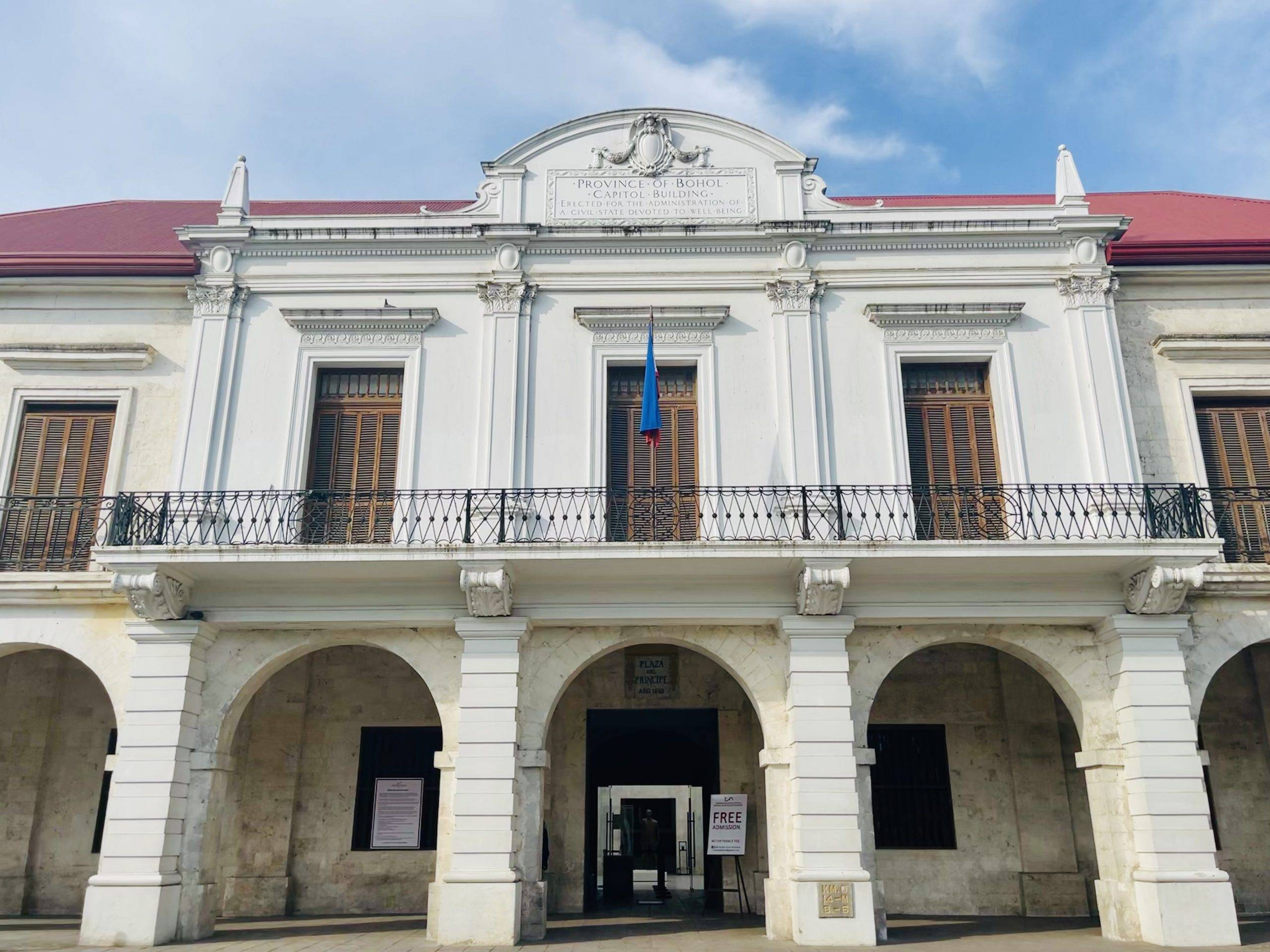
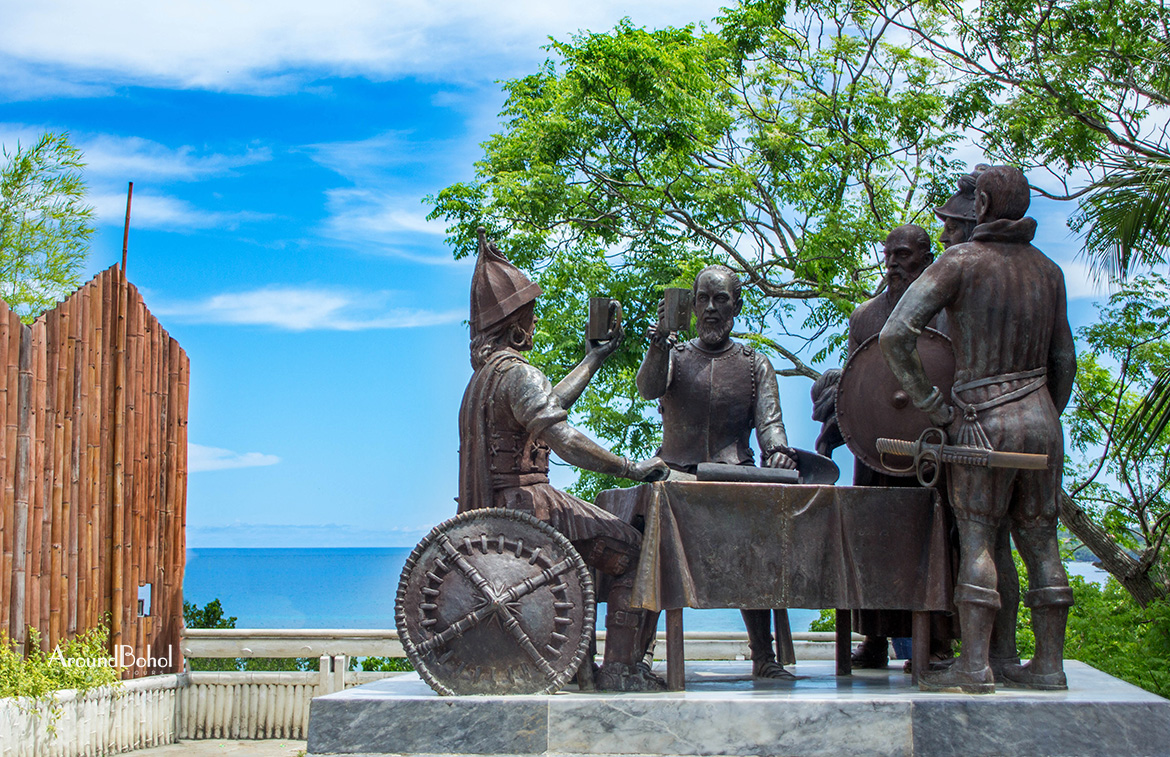
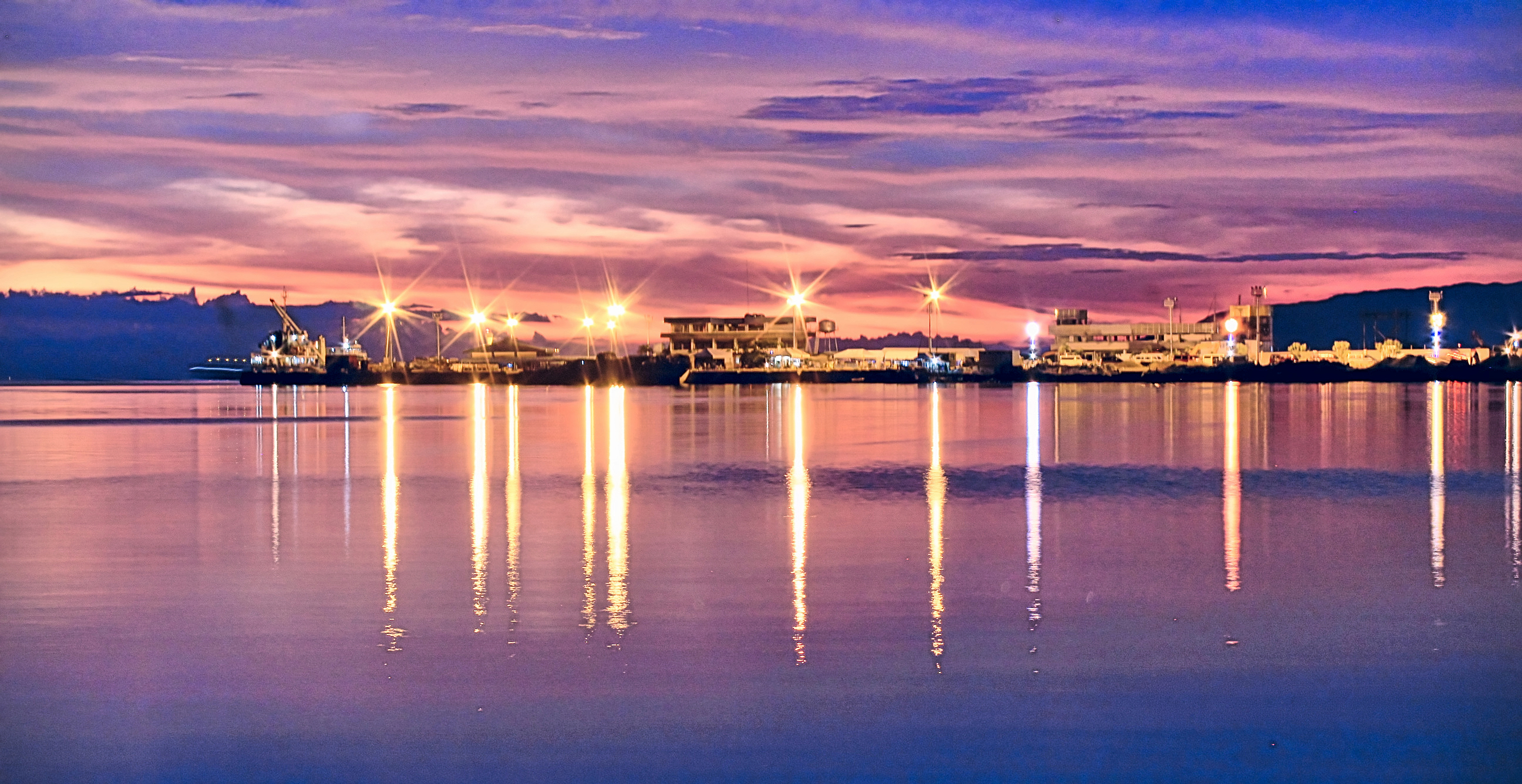
- Aerial View of Tagbilaran Tagbilaran City Hall Tagbilaran Cathedral National Museum of The Philippines - Bohol Blood Compact Shrine Port of Tagbilaran

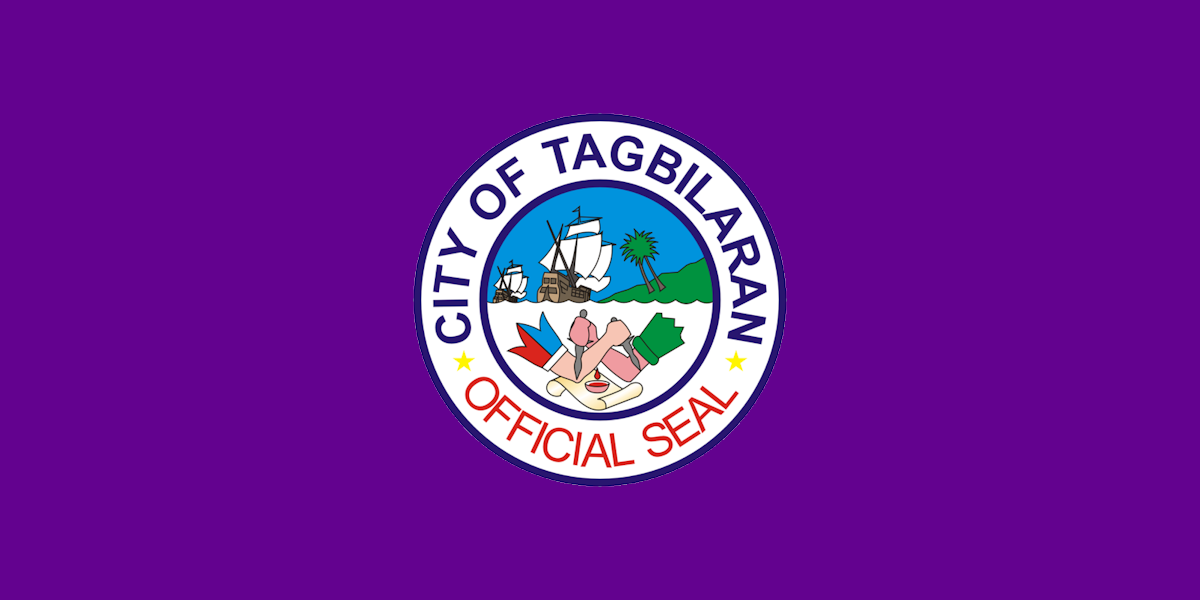
- Flag Seal
- Nickname: City of Friendship
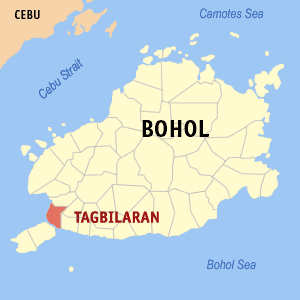
- Map of Bohol with Tagbilaran highlighted
- Interactive map of Tagbilaran
- Location within the Philippines
- Coordinates: 9°39′N 123°51′E
- Country: Philippines
- Region: Central Visayas
- Province: Bohol
- District: 1st district
- Incorporated: Municipality; City: 9 February 1742; 1 July 1966
- Barangays: 15 (see Barangays)

Government
  - Type: Sangguniang Panlungsod
  - Mayor: Jane Cajes Yap
  - Vice Mayor: Adam Jala
  - Representative: John Geesnell Yap
  - City Council: Members: Jose Floro Balangkig Ringca; Gian Carlo Tocmo Besas; Jose Esteban Timoteo Borja Butalid; Nerio Dote Zamora II; Leonides Lagura Borja; Fausto Sebandal Budlong; Agustinus Varquez Gonzaga; Christian Merick Monton Blanco; Charles Tinonga Cabalit; Gemma Manding Inting
  - Electorate: 74,277 voters (2025)

Area
  - Total: 36.50 km^{2} (14.09 sq mi)
- Elevation: 39 m (128 ft)
- Highest elevation: 449 m (1,473 ft)
- Lowest elevation: 0 m (0 ft)

Population (2024 census)
  - Total: 106,120
  - Density: 2,907/km^{2} (7,530/sq mi)
  - Households: 23,078

Economy
  - Income class: 2nd city income class
  - Poverty incidence: 10.18% (2023)
  - Revenue: ₱ 1,261 million (2024)
  - Assets: ₱ 3,605 million (2024)
  - Expenditure: ₱ 594.2 million (2024)
  - Liabilities: ₱ 714.9 million (2024)

Service provider
  - Electricity: Bohol Light Company (BLCI)
- Time zone: UTC+8 (PST)
- ZIP code: 6300
- PSGC: 071242000
- IDD : area code: +63 (0)38
- Native languages: Boholano dialect Cebuano; Tagalog
- Feast date: May 1
- Patron saint: Saint Joseph the Worker
- Website: tagbilaran.gov.ph

Tagbilaran, officially the City of Tagbilaran (Cebuano: Dakbayan sa Tagbilaran; Filipino: Lungsod ng Tagbilaran), is a component city and capital of the province of Bohol, Philippines. According to the 2024 census, it has a population of 106,120 people making it the most populous in the province.

Tagbilaran is the principal gateway to Bohol, 630 km (390 mi) southeast of the national capital of Manila and 72 km (45 mi) south of the regional capital, Cebu City.

== Etymology ==
According to oral tradition, the name is a Hispanicized form of "Tagubilaan", a compound of tagu, meaning "to hide" and "Bilaan", referring to the Blaan people, who were said to have raided the Visayan Islands. This explanation seems to correlate with the government's explanation. According to the official government website of Tagbilaran, it is said to have been derived from tinabilan meaning shielded, as the town was protected by Panglao from potential invaders.

== History ==
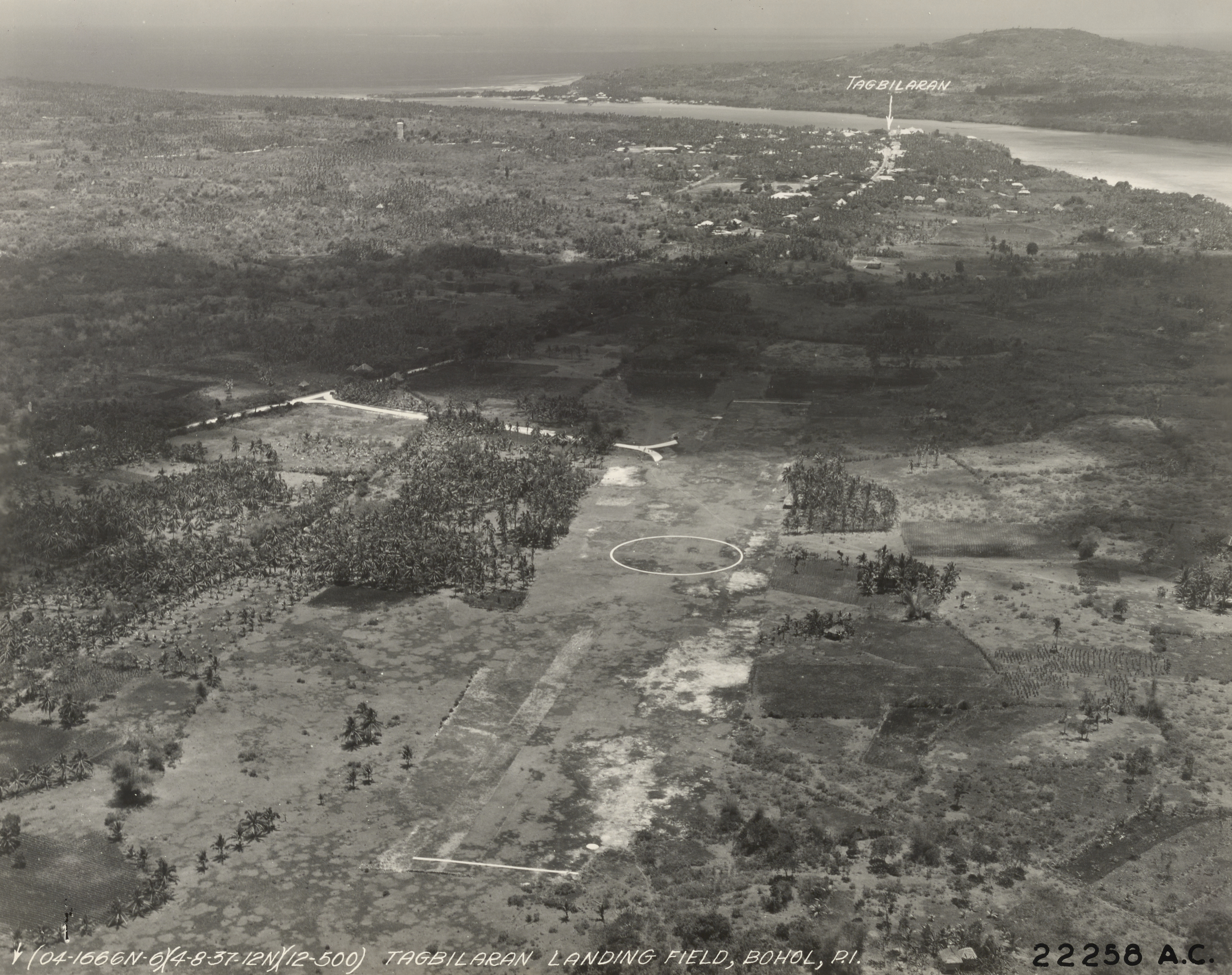
Aerial view of Tagbilaran, 1937

A hundred years before Spaniards arrived in the Philippines, the settlement which eventually became Tagbilaran was already involved in trading with China and Malays. Tagbilaran Strait was the location of the precolonial polity of Bo-ol. This early settlement had contact with the Spaniards in 1565, when the Spanish conquistador Miguel López de Legazpi and the native chieftain Datu Sikatuna pledged peace and cooperation through the famous blood compact.

San José de Tagbilaran was established as a town on 9 February 1742, by General Francisco Antonio Calderón de la Barca, Military Governor of the Visayas Islands, who separated it from the town of Baclayon. The town was dedicated to St. Joseph the Worker. Since then it was part of the province of Bohol until it became a chartered city on 18 July 1966, by virtue of Republic Act No. 4660.

The 1818 census showed that Dauis-Tagbilaran had 2,055 native families and 9 Spanish-Filipino families.

On June 19, 1854, the Captain of Engineers Guillermo Kirkpatrick arrived in Bohol after being appointed as its first politico-military governor of Bohol. Queen Isabela II, through a royal decree on March 3, 1854, granted him the authority to establish his capital in the town of Tagbilaran and formally took command.

The city was occupied by the United States during the Philippine–American War and by Imperial Japan during World War II.

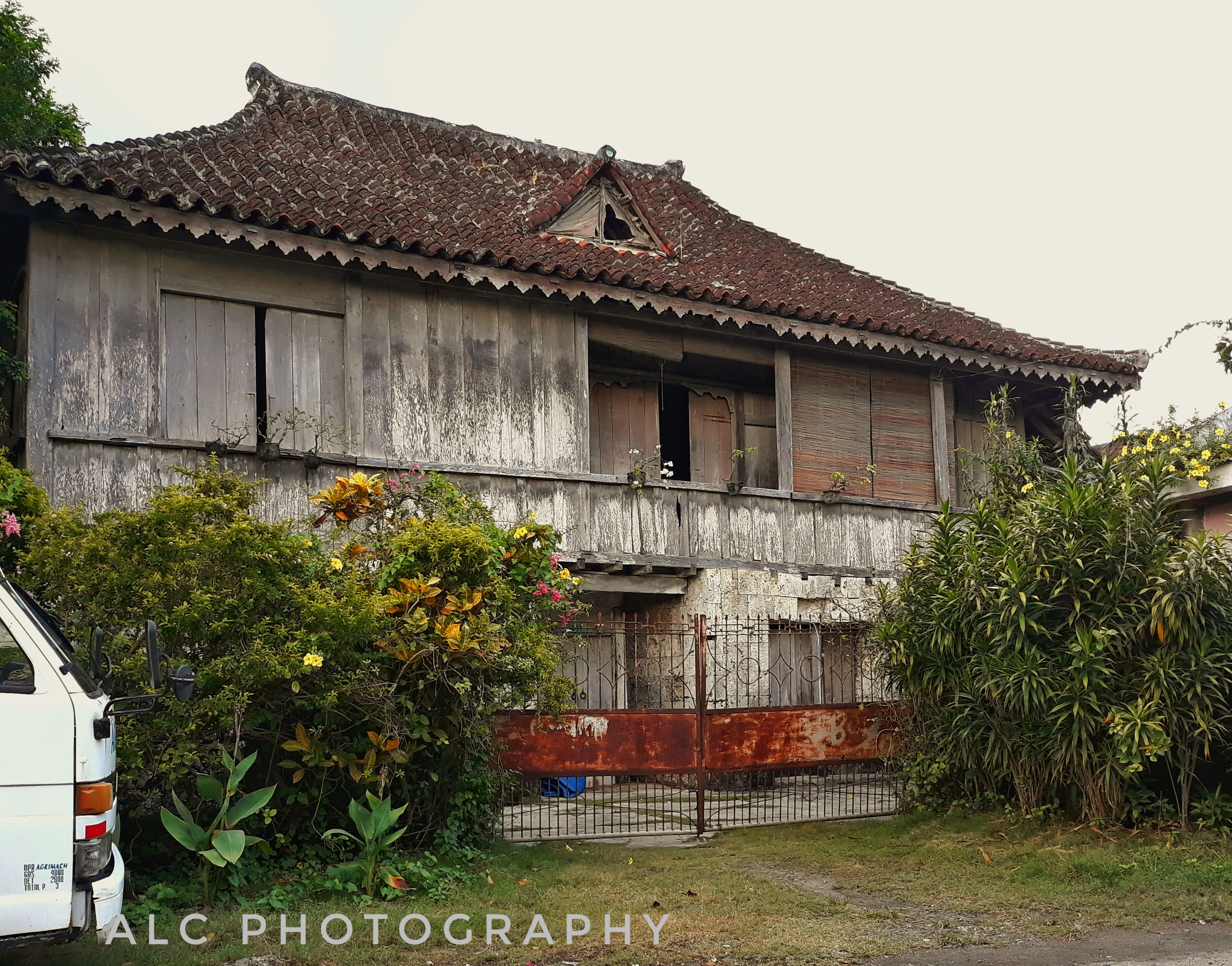
Rocha–Suarez House in Sitio Ubos

Sitio Ubos (Lower Town) is Tagbilaran's former harbor site and is considered to be the city's oldest portion, having been a busy trading center since the seventeenth century until the early twentieth century. As such, the place houses the oldest and largest number of heritage houses in Bohol. Sitio Ubos declined as a major port towards the end of the Spanish era when the causeway to Panglao Island was constructed. Since then, the area lost its former glory and its old houses were either demolished or neglected.

In 2002, in recognition of its cultural and historic significance, Sitio Ubos was declared a "Cultural Heritage Area". Some of the surviving heritage houses to this day include the Rocha–Suarez House, Rocha House, Hontanosas House, Beldia House, and Yap House.

=== Historic events ===
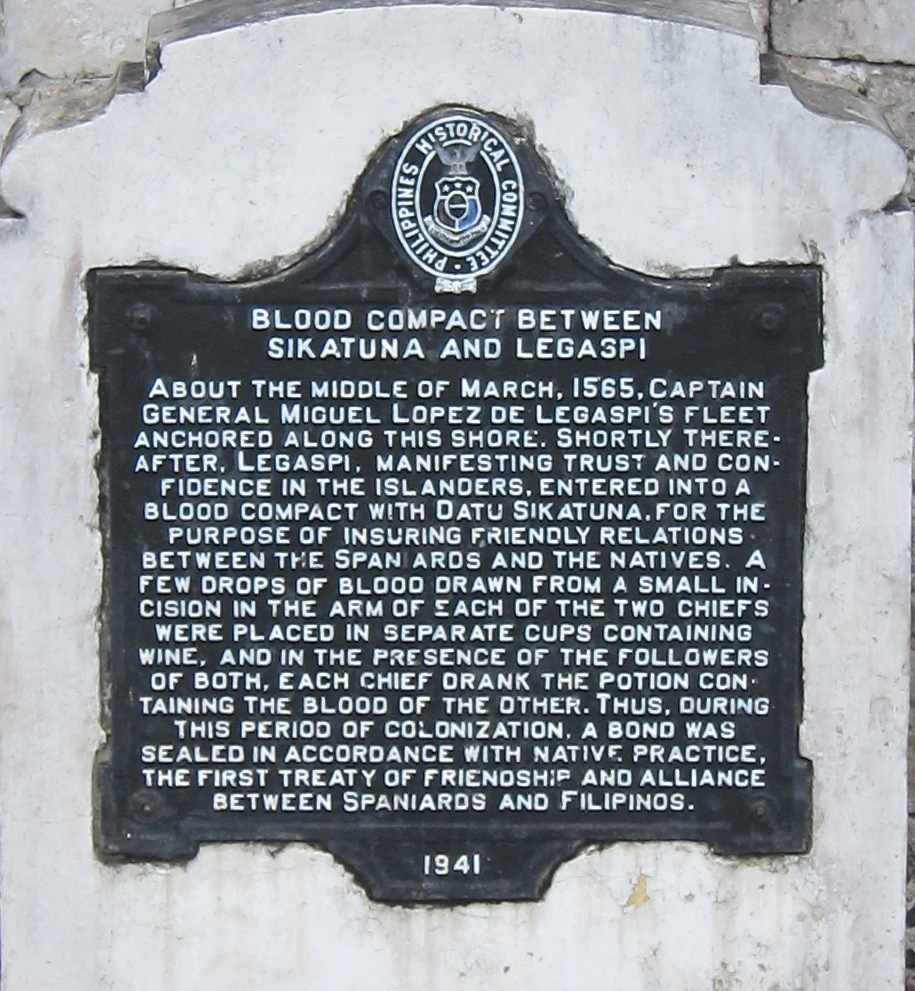
The historical marker of the blood compact in Bool

One of the most important events in Philippine history (immortalized on canvas by the famous Filipino painter Juan Luna) was the blood compact between Datu Sikatuna, a local native chieftain, and Captain Miguel López de Legazpi, the Spanish explorer and colonizer. It was believed that it took place in the coast of Bool, now a barangay of Tagbilaran, on 16 March 1565, a day after Legazpi and his crew of conquistadores on four ships chanced upon the shores of Bool during their trip to the province of Butuan from Camiguin Island because of strong southwest monsoon winds and low tide.

But in March 2006, the National Historical Institute (now National Historical Commission of the Philippines) installed a stone marker with an iron plaque at Villalimpia, Hinawanan Bay, Loay, to rectify the error once and for all. The historical marker states that:

Ang Sandugo

Sa look ng Hinawanan, Loay naganap ang sandugo sa pagitan nina Miguel Lopez de Legazpi at Datu Sikatuna ng Bohol sa loob ng barkong San Pedro ng Espanya, 25 Marso 1565. Isinagawa sa pamamagitan ng pag-inom ng alak na inihalo sa dugo mula sa hiwa sa dibdib ng dalawang pinuno. Naging simula ng pagkakaibigan ng mga Espanyol at mga Boholano at Kristiyanisasyon ng Pulo.

Tagbilaran was occupied by Imperial Japanese forces on 17 May 1942, after the fall of the Philippines during World War II.

During the Japanese occupation, the municipal government of Tagbilaran, whose mayor at the time was Manuel Espuelas, moved from the Poblacion to Tiptip. Another significant event was the Battle of Ubujan wherein a guerrilla unit under the command of Captain Francisco Salazar (aka Vicente Cubello) engaged Japanese troops against overwhelming odds.

=== 2013 earthquake ===
An earthquake with magnitude 7.2, with an epicenter near Sagbayan, Bohol, struck Bohol on October 15, 2013. Tagbilaran received four fatalities and 21 injuries, and damage to buildings, including the seaport, airport, and city hall.

== Geography ==
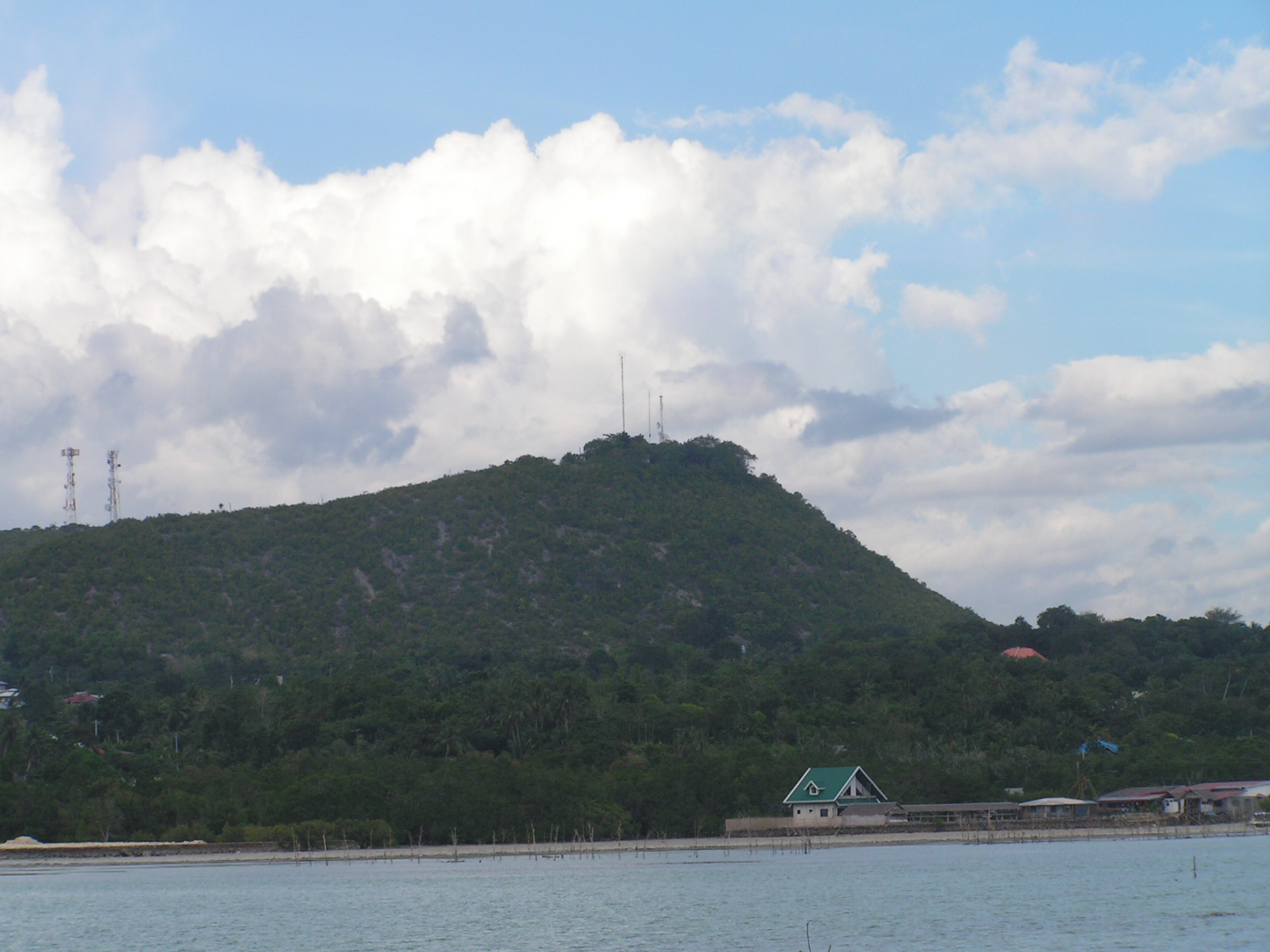
Banat-i Hill bordering the end of Tagbilaran

Tagbilaran is shaped a strip with two hills, Elley Hull (100 meters) and Banat-i (145 meters), located on its southern and northern borders respectively.

With a coastline of 13 km (8.1 mi) on the southwestern part of the island, the city shares its boundaries with the towns of Cortes, Corella, and Baclayon.

=== Climate ===
Climate data for Tagbilaran City (1981–2010)
Month	Jan	Feb	Mar	Apr	May	Jun	Jul	Aug	Sep	Oct	Nov	Dec	Year
Mean daily maximum °C (°F)	31.1 (88.0)	31.6 (88.9)	32.4 (90.3)	33.3 (91.9)	33.5 (92.3)	32.9 (91.2)	32.5 (90.5)	32.8 (91.0)	32.8 (91.0)	32.4 (90.3)	32.0 (89.6)	31.4 (88.5)	32.4 (90.3)
Daily mean °C (°F)	26.8 (80.2)	27.1 (80.8)	27.6 (81.7)	28.5 (83.3)	29.0 (84.2)	28.7 (83.7)	28.4 (83.1)	28.7 (83.7)	28.6 (83.5)	28.2 (82.8)	27.8 (82.0)	27.2 (81.0)	28.0 (82.4)
Mean daily minimum °C (°F)	22.6 (72.7)	22.5 (72.5)	22.8 (73.0)	23.6 (74.5)	24.4 (75.9)	24.4 (75.9)	24.3 (75.7)	24.5 (76.1)	24.4 (75.9)	24.0 (75.2)	23.6 (74.5)	23.0 (73.4)	23.7 (74.7)
Average rainfall mm (inches)	101.0 (3.98)	79.6 (3.13)	76.6 (3.02)	67.5 (2.66)	81.5 (3.21)	128.2 (5.05)	126.7 (4.99)	116.3 (4.58)	126.5 (4.98)	176.3 (6.94)	178.9 (7.04)	153.6 (6.05)	1,412.6 (55.61)
Average rainy days (≥ 0.1 mm)	14	11	11	9	10	15	15	13	14	18	18	16	164
Average relative humidity (%)	83	81	79	78	79	81	82	80	81	83	85	84	81
Source: PAGASA

=== Barangays ===
Tagbilaran is politically subdivided into 15 barangays. Each barangay consists of puroks and some have sitios.

With a population of 104,976 for the year 2020 census, and an annual growth rate of 1.56%. However, 44% of the city's population reside in the four urban districts where trade and commerce are also concentrated.

PSGC	Barangay	Population			±% p.a.		Area		PD 2024	
		2024		2010			ha	acre	/km^{2}	/sq mi
071242001	Bool	5.8%	6,132	5,972	▴	0.18%	349	862	1,800	4,600
071242002	Booy	9.3%	9,838	8,800	▴	0.78%	146	361	6,700	17,000
071242003	Cabawan	1.6%	1,734	1,531	▴	0.87%	267	660	650	1,700
071242004	Cogon	16.7%	17,750	17,114	▴	0.25%	204	504	8,700	23,000
071242006	Dampas	9.3%	9,838	8,440	▴	1.07%	444	1,097	2,200	5,700
071242005	Dao	8.3%	8,858	6,772	▴	1.88%	391	966	2,300	5,900
071242008	Manga	6.8%	7,224	6,460	▴	0.78%	117	289	6,200	16,000
071242009	Mansasa	5.7%	6,069	6,156	▾	−0.10%	83	205	7,300	19,000
071242010	Poblacion I	2.9%	3,057	3,072	▾	−0.03%	26	64	12,000	30,000
071242011	Poblacion II	5.1%	5,431	5,029	▴	0.53%	70	173	7,800	20,000
071242012	Poblacion III	5.5%	5,873	6,051	▾	−0.21%	71	175	8,300	21,000
071242013	San Isidro	5.1%	5,424	4,821	▴	0.82%	429	1,060	1,300	3,300
071242014	Taloto	6.9%	7,367	6,376	▴	1.01%	245	605	3,000	7,800
071242015	Tiptip	4.6%	4,882	4,360	▴	0.79%	282	697	1,700	4,500
071242016	Ubujan	5.3%	5,574	5,134	▴	0.57%	146	361	3,800	9,900
	Total		106,120	96,792	▴	0.64%	3,650	9,019	2,900	14

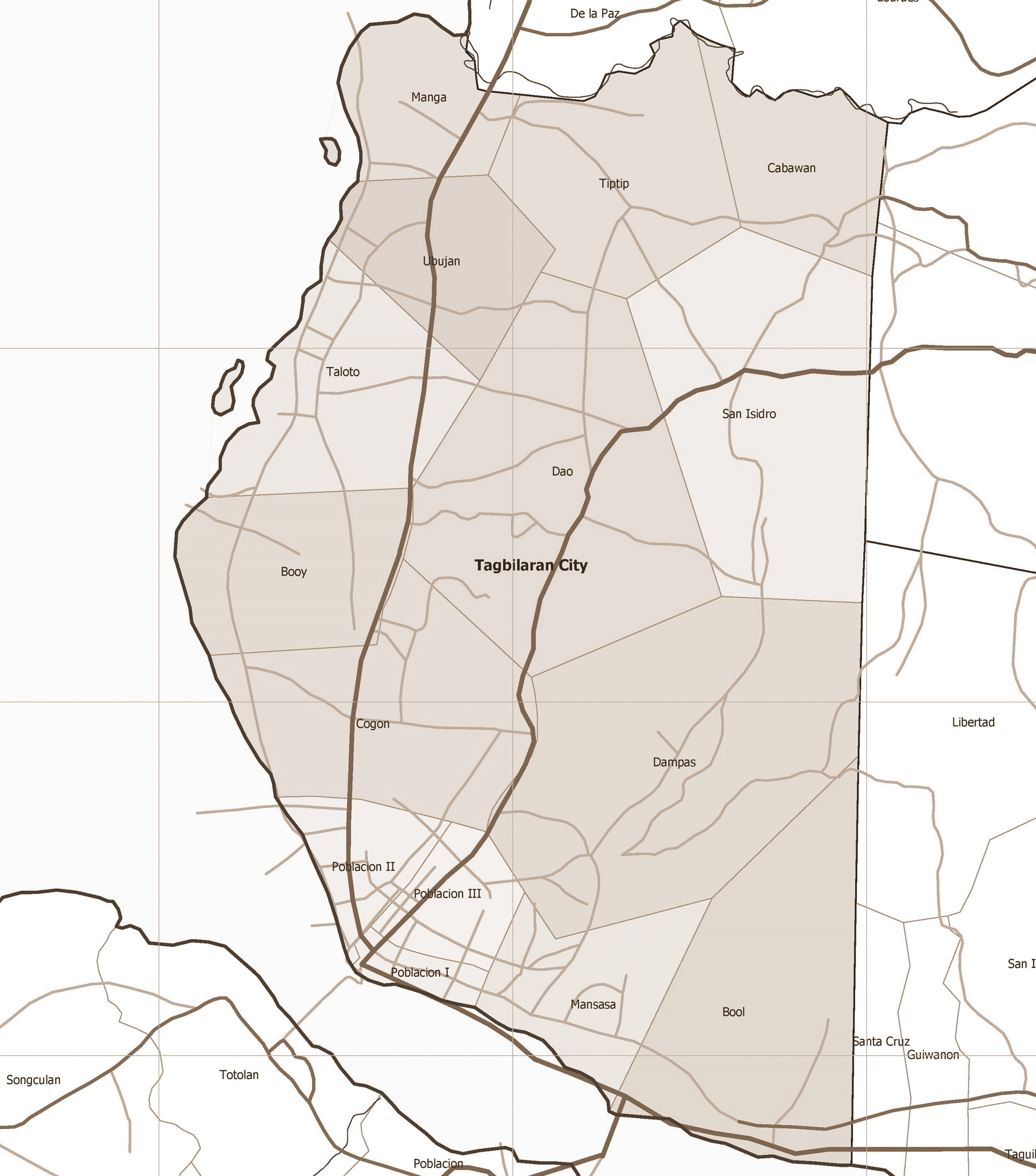
Map of Tagbilaran showing barangays and islands

== Demographics ==
Population census of Tagbilaran

Year	Pop.	±% p.a.
1903	10,108	—
1918	12,305	+1.32%
1939	15,617	+1.14%
1948	16,051	+0.31%
1960	20,250	+1.96%
1970	33,005	+5.00%

Year	Pop.	±% p.a.
1975	37,335	+2.50%
1980	42,683	+2.71%
1990	56,363	+2.82%
1995	66,683	+3.20%
2000	77,700	+3.33%
2007	92,297	+2.40%

Year	Pop.	±% p.a.
2010	96,792	+1.75%
2015	105,051	+1.57%
2020	104,976	−0.02%
2024	106,120	+0.26%

Source: Philippine Statistics Authority

== Economy ==
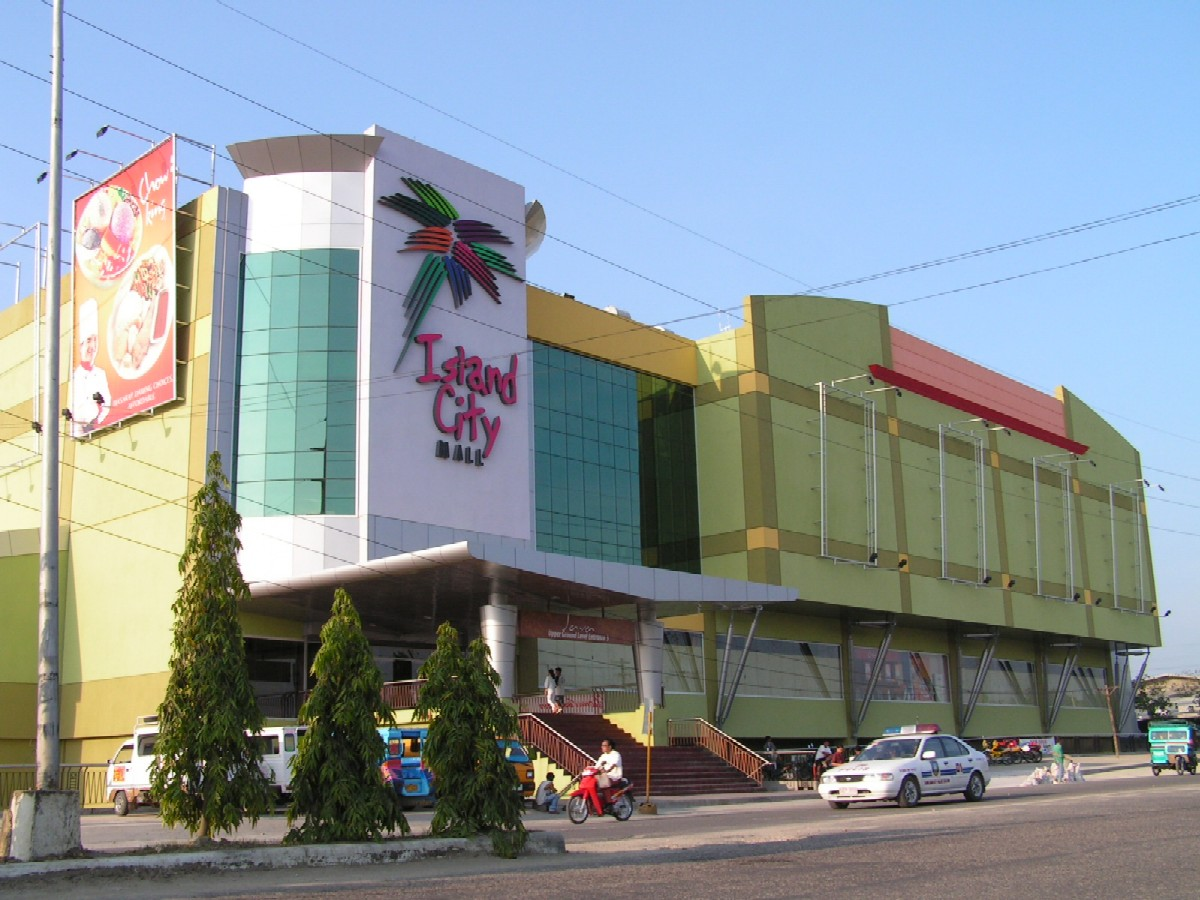
Island City Mall (usually known as 'ICM')

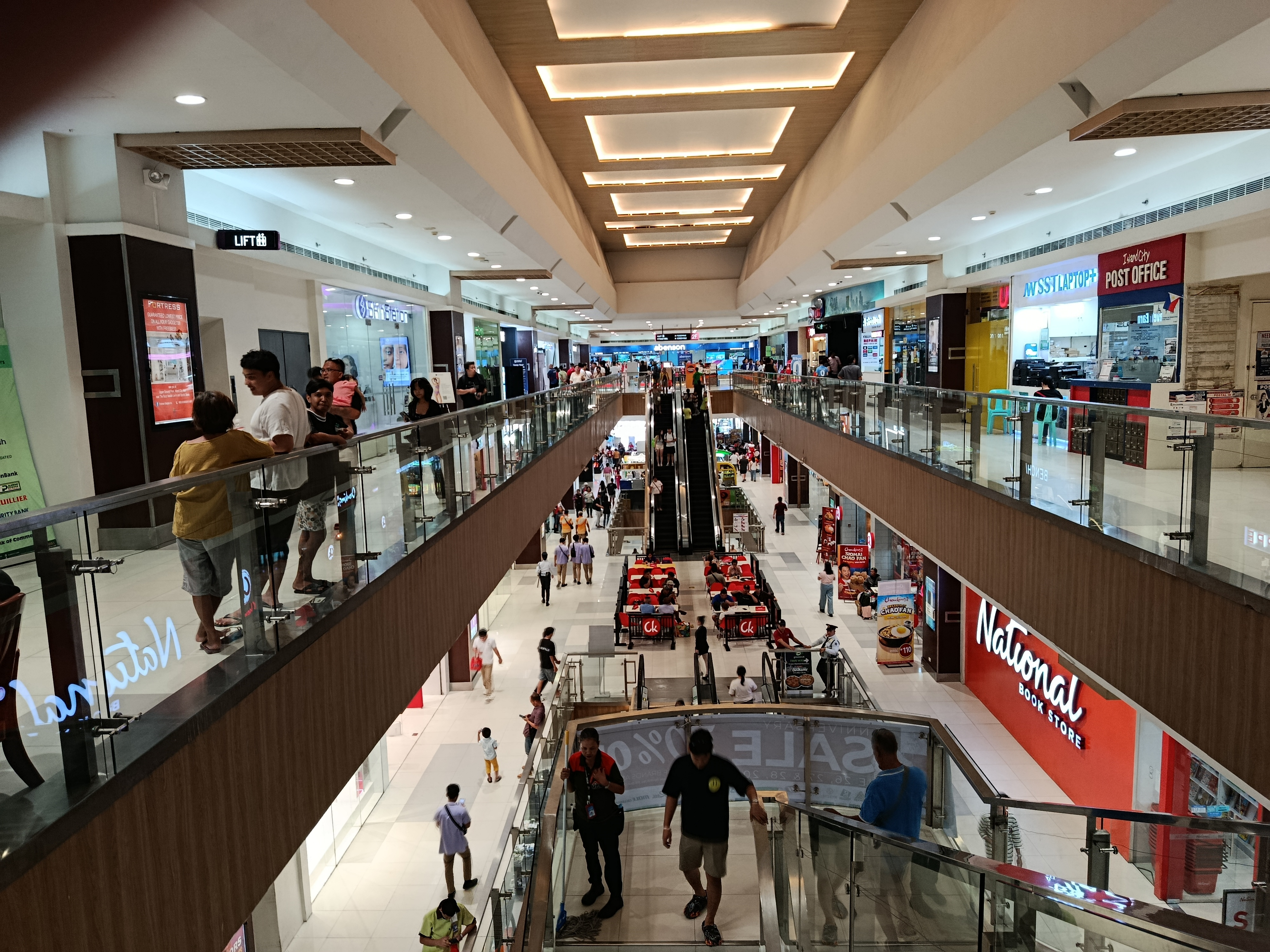
Interior of Island City Mall, Tagbilaran

Poverty incidence of Tagbilaran (%)

Source: Philippine Statistics Authority

The city has the advantage of being the province's main business capital and center of governance, education and transportation. Local and international visitors to Bohol pass through the city via the Port of Tagbilaran.

Alturas Group (operator of Alturas Mall, Island City Mall and Plaza Marcela), Bohol Quality Corporation and Alvarez Group are some of the notable locally owned companies based in the city.

== Government ==
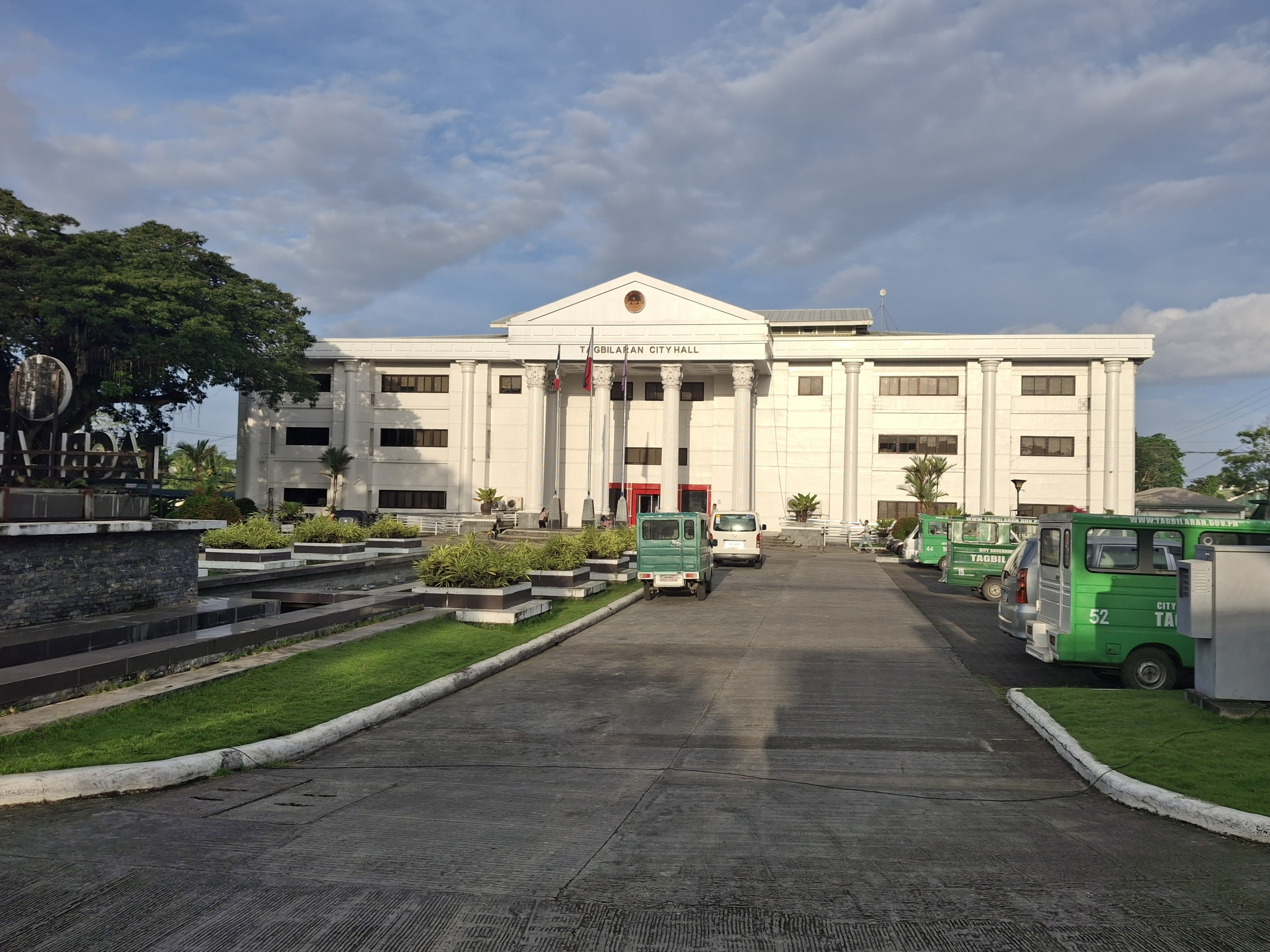
Tagbilaran City Hall in 2026

=== Chief Executives since 1742 ===
The city is governed locally by a mayor, although historically by a gobernadorcillo and presidente municipal afterwards.

=== Chief Executives of Tagbilaran since 1742 ===
==== Gobernadorcillo ====
Term		Title	Name
	1742	Gobernadorcillo	Calixto Marcos
1744 –	1829	Sector Leader of Dagohoy	Calixto Sotero
unknown		Gobernadorcillo	Martin Flores
unknown		Gobernadorcillo	Manuel de la Peña
	1832	Gobernadorcillo	Leonardo Guillermo
	1854	Gobernadorcillo	Leon Torralba
	1855	Gobernadorcillo	Francisco Reales
	1856	Gobernadorcillo	Esteban Butalid
	1857	Gobernadorcillo	Alejandro Fama
	1870	Gobernadorcillo	Pedro Matig‑a
	1876	Gobernadorcillo	Felipe Rocha
c.	1880	Gobernadorcillo	Jacinto Borja y Borja
c.	1885	Gobernadorcillo	Flaviano Ramirez
c.	1892	Gobernadorcillo	Manuel Miñoza
	1898	Gobernadorcillo	Eduardo Calceta

==== Presidente Municipal ====
Term		Title	Name
19 May 1898 –	Apr 1899	Presidente Municipal	Salustiano Borja
Apr 1899 –	17 May 1900	Presidente Municipal	Margarito Torralba

==== Municipal President ====
Term		Title	Name
	1900	Municipal President	Claudio Gallares
1901 –	1902	Municipal President	Aniceto Clarin
1 Apr 1902 –	1903	Municipal President	Macario Sarmiento
1904 –	1905	Municipal President	Servando Matig‑a
	1906	Municipal President	Mariano Parras
	1907	Municipal President	Margarito Torralba
	1908	Municipal President	Gaudencio Mendoza
	1909	Municipal President	Lorenzo Torralba
	1910	Municipal President	Felipe Sarmiento
	1911	Municipal President	Miguel Parras
	1912	Municipal President	Nicolas Butalid
19 Oct 1912 –	1916	Municipal President	Celestino Gallares
6 Oct 1916 –	24 May 1918	Municipal President	Jacinto Remolador
25 May 1918 –	1919	Municipal President	Gregorio Peñaflor
1920 –	1922	Municipal President	Felipe Sarmiento
1923 –	1925	Municipal President	Timoteo Butalid
1926 –	1931	Municipal President	Andres Torralba
1931 –	1938	Municipal President	Genaro Visarra

==== Municipal Mayor ====
Term		Title	Name
1939 –	1941	Municipal Mayor	Honorio Grupo
22 May 1942 –	1945	Municipal Mayor	Manuel Espuelas
26 May 1945 –	1946	Municipal Mayor	Mariano Rocha
Apr 1946 –	Aug 1946	Municipal Mayor	Manuel Espuelas
2 Sep 1946 –	Dec 1947	Municipal Mayor	Honorio Grupo
1 Jan 1948 –	31 Dec 1959	Municipal Mayor	Pedro Belderol
(3 terms)		Municipal Mayor	Pedro Belderol

==== City Mayor ====
Term		Title	Image	Name
1 Jan 1960 –	31 Dec 1971	City Mayor		Venancio Inting
(3 terms)		City Mayor		Venancio Inting
1 Jan 1972 –	31 Dec 1979	City Mayor		Rolando Butalid
(2 terms)		City Mayor		Rolando Butalid
1 Jan 1980 –	Mar 1986	City Mayor		Jose Ma. Rocha
(3 terms)		City Mayor		Jose Ma. Rocha
19 Mar 1986 –	18 Jan 1987	OIC City Mayor		Dan Lim
19 Jan 1987 –	1 Dec 1987	OIC City Mayor		Jose Torralba
2 Dec 1987 –	6 Dec 1987	OIC City Mayor		Carmen Gatal
7 Dec 1987 –	17 May 1988	OIC City Mayor		Bonifacio Libay
18 May 1988 –	23 Jun 1988	OIC City Mayor		Ismael Villamor
24 Jun 1988 –	30 Jun 1992	City Mayor		Jose Torralba
30 Jun 1992 –	30 Jun 1995	City Mayor		Jose Ma. Rocha
30 Jun 1995 –	30 Jun 2004	City Mayor		Jose Torralba
(3 terms)		City Mayor		Jose Torralba
30 Jun 2004 –	30 Jun 2013	City Mayor		Dan Lim
(3 terms)		City Mayor		Dan Lim
30 Jun 2013 –	30 June 2022	City Mayor		John Geesnell Yap
(3 terms)		City Mayor		John Geesnell Yap
30 Jun 2022 –	present	City Mayor		Jane Cajes Yap

== Tourism ==
The city is a hub for Bohol province's attractions: namely the Chocolate Hills, tarsiers, white sandy beaches, dive spots, heritage sites and old stone churches. Home to several hotels, resorts, and restaurants, the city has recently become a venue for national conventions and gatherings.

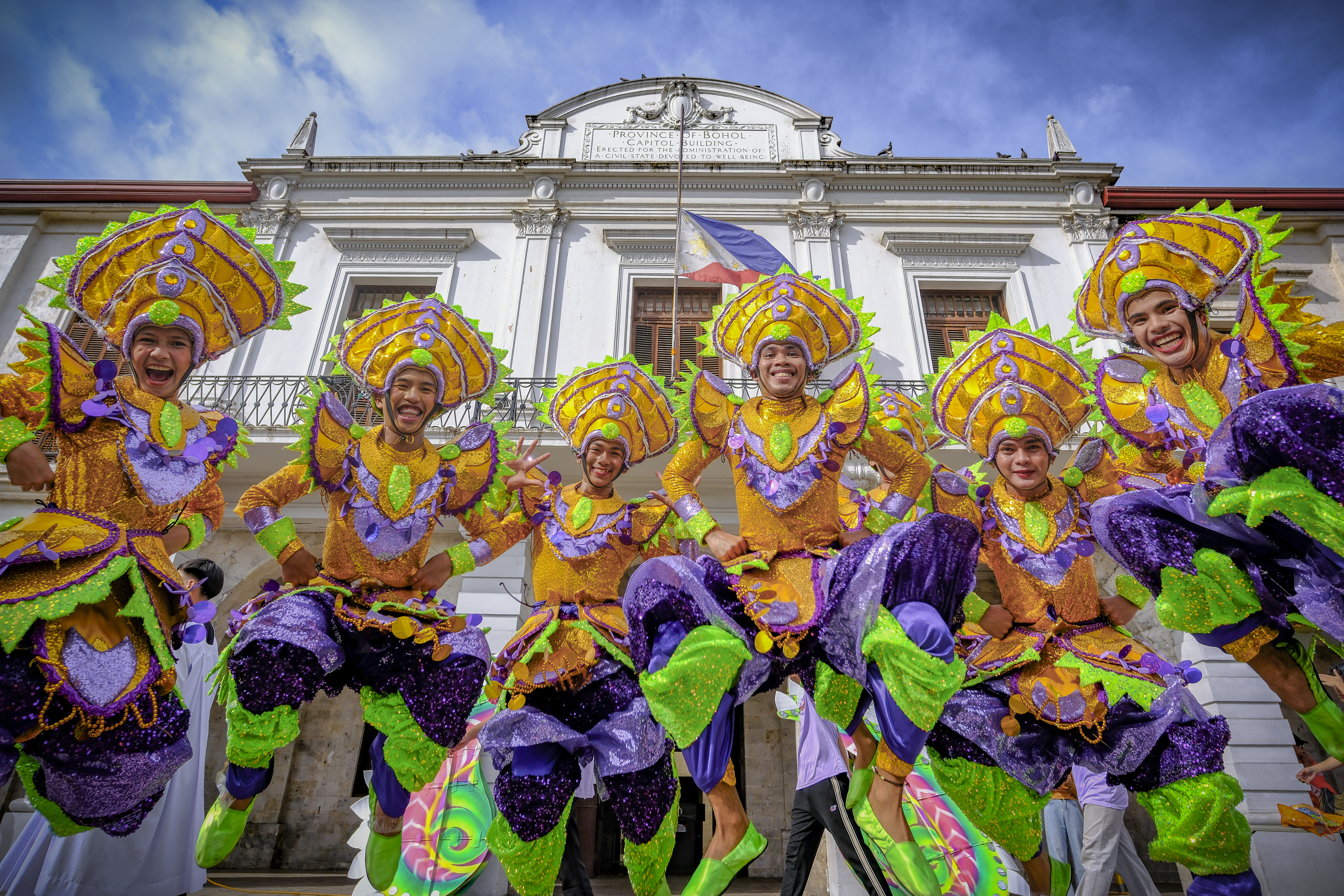
Saulog street dancers in front of the old provincial capitol

=== Festivals ===
Saulog-Tagbilaran Festival is a celebration every April 20 to May 2. This includes street-dancing, fluvial procession, nightly activities, novena masses and a beauty pageant contest.

The Sandugo Festival is an annual celebration in Tagbilaran in commemoration of the blood compact between Miguel López de Legazpi and Datu Sikatuna in March 1565. The festival is celebrated every July to coincide with the month-long activities celebrating the city's Charter Day on July 1 and Bohol on July 22.

== Transportation ==
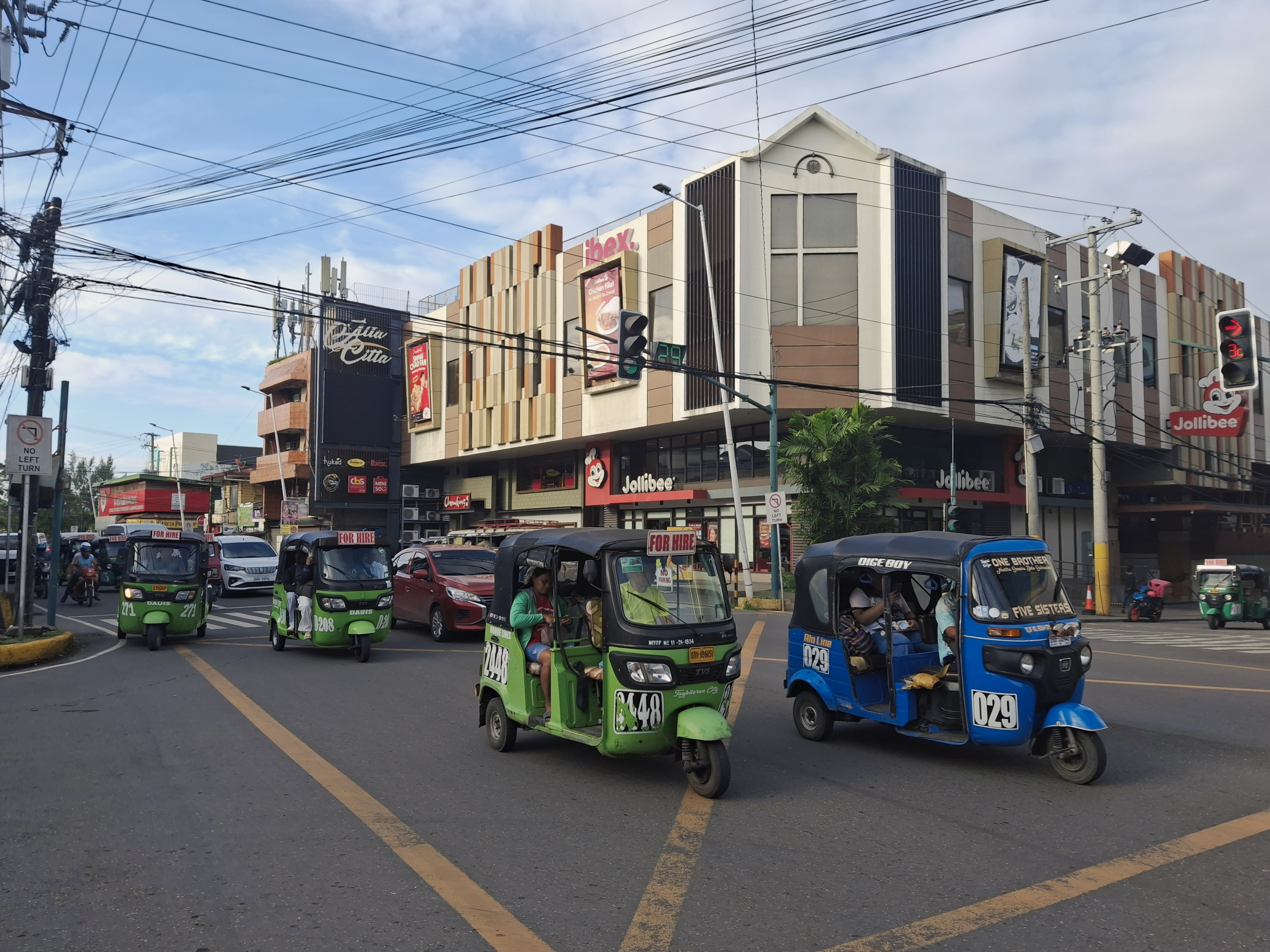
Modern tricycles in downtown Tagbilaran

Tagbilaran's local transport system consists of; tricycles, multicabs, taxis, and jeepneys. Buses, taxis and vans are usually hired for out-of-town travel. The Integrated Bus Terminal (IBT) located in the city district of Dao serves as the terminal point for public transport vehicles serving the inter-city routes within the province and also serves as the terminal for passengers taking the bus route from Tagbilaran to Metro Manila. There is also a bus station for long-distance travel in Cogon market.

The city is linked by sea to the major port cities in the Visayas Islands and Mindanao, which of major commercial importance is its link to the regional capital of Cebu City. A fastcraft ferry ride to Cebu City's Pier 1 takes approximately 2 hours depending on weather and sea conditions. The route is served by Ocean Jet exclusively as of June 2024 several times daily, with Weesam Express and SuperCat having suspended operations.

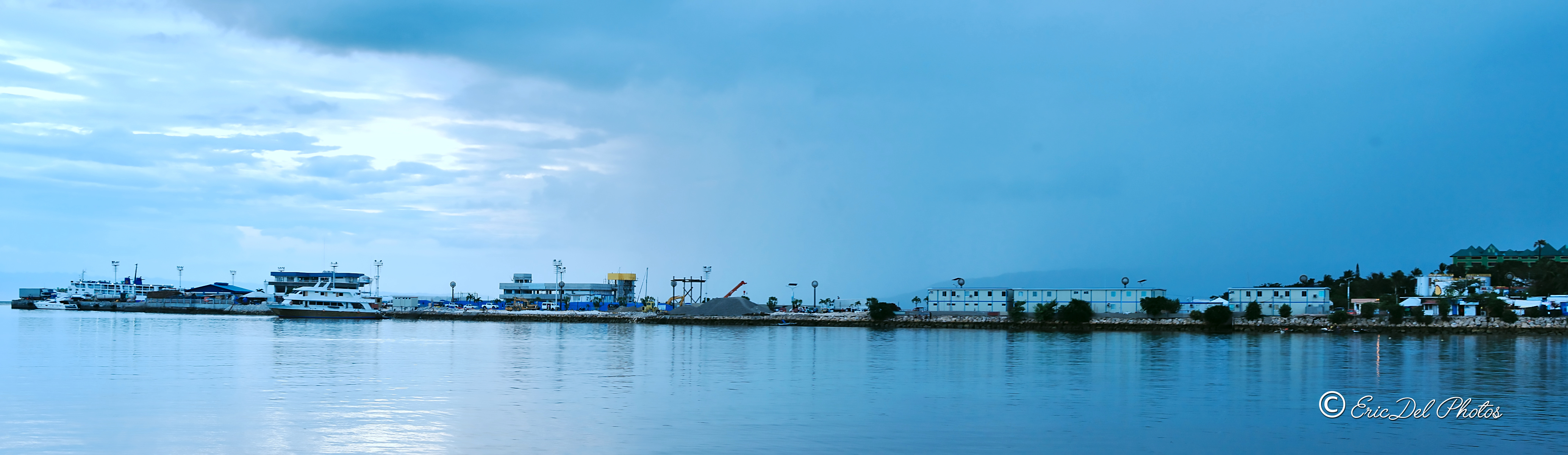
Tagbilaran sea port

Bohol–Panglao International Airport is situated at the Panglao Island southwest of the city. It replaced Tagbilaran Airport on November 27, 2018. It serves as the gateway airport to the rest of the province. Airlines using the airport serve primarily the Tagbilaran-Manila route, Tagbilaran-Clark route, and also Mindanao. The route is served by Cebu Pacific, PAL Express, and AirAsia Philippines using Airbus A319, Airbus A320 and ATR 72 planes.

== Healthcare ==
The city is served with a mix of public and private health care institutions that also cater to the health needs of the rest of the province. Complex major cases and services are sent to Cebu City due to limited facilities.

Health facilities:

- Holy Name University Medical Center Foundation, Inc.
- Borja Family Hospital Corporation - Closed
- Bohol Doctors Hospital
- Governor Celestino Gallares Memorial Regional Hospital (tertiary public)
- MMG Bohol Cooperative Hospital
- Ramiro Community Hospital (tertiary private)
- Bohol St. Jude General Hospital - Closed
- Tagbilaran Community Hospital
- Tagbilaran Maternity and Children's Hospital - Closed

== Education ==
As the capital of Bohol, Tagbilaran is the main center for education in the province. All of the province's universities are located in the city as well as other well-known institutions of learning.

Colleges and universities:

- Tagbilaran City College
- Bohol Island State University (BISU)
- BIT International College (BIT-IC, formerly Bohol Institute of Technology (BIT))
- Bohol Technical Institute (BTI)
- Bohol Wisdom School
- Holy Name University
- Holy Spirit School of Tagbilaran, Inc.
- Immaculate Heart of Mary Seminary (IHMS)
- PMI Colleges Bohol
- University of Bohol

== Notable personalities ==
=== Sports ===
- Mark Magsayo – Boxer
- Czar Amonsot – Boxer
- Vanessa Sarno – Medalist, Weightlifting

=== Academe ===
- José Abueva – Academician

=== Culture and Arts ===
- Napoleon Abueva – Artist

=== Entertainment and Media ===
- Colet Vergara - Member of Pinoy pop group Bini
- Rich Asuncion – Starstruck Finalist/TV Actress
- Maxelende Ganade – Singer-songwriter
- Luke Mejares – TV Personality/Singer
- Hazel Mae - sportscaster
- Marco Sison – Singer
- Isagani Yambot – Journalist

=== Politics ===
- Jose Clarin – Third President pro tempore of the Senate of the Philippines (1934–1935) and former acting Senate President of the Philippines (1932)
- Cecilio Putong – Secretary of Education (1952)
- Fermin Torralba – Secretary of the Philippine Senate (1931–1935)
- Nestor Principe - Martial arts instructor and activist martyred during the Marcos dictatorship and honored at the Bantayog ng mga Bayani

== Sources ==
- Akpenodu, Erik; Saloma, Czarina (2011). Casa Boholana: Vintage Houses of Bohol. Manila: Ateneo de Manila UP. ISBN 978-9715506182.
