= Francisco Salazar (guerrilla) =

Filipino guerrilla commander

- Born: Vicente T. Cubero; September 28, 1911; Barrio Carmen, Lanuza, Surigao, Philippine Islands
- Died: October 22, 1942 (aged 31); Ubujan, Tagbilaran, Bohol, Philippines
- Cause of death: Being shot by Japanese forces.
- Burial place: Tubigon, Loon (transferred)
- Height: 1.6 m (5 ft 3 in)
- Parents: Isidro Cubero (father); Antonia Tejol (mother)
- Military career
- Allegiance: Philippines; United States
- Branch: Regular Army
- Unit: USAFFE
- Conflicts: Japanese occupation of the Philippines

Vicente T. Cubero (September 28, 1911 – October 22, 1942), also known as Captain Francisco Salazar, was a Filipino guerrilla commander and a secret USAFFE agent. He is considered the national hero of Bohol. He died after he was shot by Japanese forces in Ubujan, Tagbilaran. A memorial was established in Tagbilaran to honor his bravery.

== Early life ==
Cubero was born on September 28, 1911, in Barrio Carmen, Lanuza, Surigao. His parents were full-bloodied Boholanos, originally from Bohol. His father, Isidro Cubero, hailed from Loon while his mother, Antonia Tejol, is from Corella. In Cubero's boyhood, they lived in 2 cities before they migrated and settled in Surigao.

Fr. Pete Cubero Arguillas, son of Cubero's sister, Juliana Cubero, became the first priest from Siargao Island, .

== World War II ==
Before the war, Cubero was originally a USAFFE agent tasked with spying on pro-Japanese spies based in Bohol. He later boarded a boat bound for Bohol in Macrohon, Leyte in May 1942, making several stops, and disembarking in Bohol in the later part of June 1942. While in Bohol, Salazar met and befriended Lt. Juan "Aning" Relampagos, who led the trading vessel he boarded in Leyte. Relampagos identified himself as a USAFFE officer; Cubero introduced himself as Captain Francisco Salazar, who experienced the same actions with Relampagos. Over the course of the voyage, Salazar eventually revealed his true identity to Relampagos. After landing in Bohol, Salazar served as a secret USAFFE agent. He went from place to place incognito or assuming different aliases. Salazar was assigned to manage active combat operations against the Japanese.

=== The Moalong ambuscade ===
At 7:30 am on September 27, 1942, Salazar was the commanding guerrilla following ambuscade.. Two trucks consisting of 70 Japanese soldiers were heard. Some of the Japanese soldiers were undercover while the rest of the Japanese forces were close to their area. Salazar and his men became anxious, and Salazar ordered his men to open fire. Some of the armory of the Japanese forces were appropriated and used by Salazar's men. One of the Japanese trucks was blown up and fell into the sea after a grenade was thrown into the driver's seat. Following the ambuscade, the Japanese forces were immobilized. They attempted to fight back and hid in different spots to defeat Salazar's forces.
