= Felisa Núñez Cubero =

Spanish physicist

Felisa Núñez Cubero (January 21, 1924 - August 10, 2017) was a Spanish physicist. She was the first female professor at the Polytechnic University of Madrid.

== Career ==
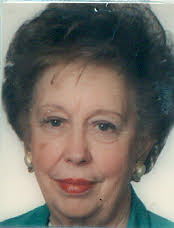
FELISA NUÑEZ CUBERO en 2015

She graduated in Chemical Sciences in 1946 in Valladolid, and began working with Professor Velayos, who greatly influenced her scientific vocation, orienting it towards physics and directing his doctoral thesis in the area of magnetism. In 1958 she received her doctorate in physics from the UCM with a thesis on permanent magnets and three years later she obtained a scholarship from the Ramsay Memorial Fellowship Trust to expand her research activity at the University of Nottingham, working on magnetic domains with Professor Bates. Her work is cited in the books Modern Magnetism of Bates and Magnetism of Rado and Shull, whose four volumes constitute an authentic encyclopedia of magnetism.

In her academic life she carried out teaching activities, starting as assistant and associate professor at the University of Valladolid (1946-1956), later as assistant professor at the Complutense University of Madrid (1956-1982) and finally at the Polytechnic University of Madrid. Here she was professor of physics, first at the University School of Telecommunications Engineering(1964-1983) and later in the University School of Forestry Technical Engineering (1983-2000), the last ten years as professor emerita. In 1990 the universities of Madrid UCM and UPM awarded her gold medals.

== Selected works ==
- "Electricity and Magnetism Laboratory" Editorial Urmo, 1972
- "100 problems Electromagnetism" Alianza Editorial, 1997

== Awards and honors ==
- First Prize Teaching of Physics. 1999, awarded by the Royal Spanish Society of Physics
- Gold Medal of the Complutense University of Madrid. June 1989
- Gold Medal of the Polytechnic University of Madrid. October 1989
