= List of Bohol provincial symbols =

The following is a list of symbols of Bohol province, Philippines.

== Provincial symbols ==
Type	Symbol	Image	Notes
Hymn	"Awit sa Bohol" "Bohol Hymn"	—	The hymn was originally composed and written in English by Justino R. Romea. A Cebuano version of the hymn exists entitled "Awit sa Bohol" which was translated by Maxelende Ganade.
Flag	Provincial Flag of Bohol		
Bird	Black-naped oriole Oriolus chinensis		Locally known as the Antolihaw or Dimodlaw
Tree	Molave; Vitex parviflora		
Fruit	Bohol Mango; Mangifera indica		
Plant	Ubi kinampay Dioscorea alata		Featured in the Ubi Festival which is held in January annually.
Flower	White gumamela Hibiscus rosa-sinensis		The flower represents the innocenece and naturalness of the residents of Bohol. Hospitality is represented by the flower's long bowing styles. The tender structure with pollens symbolizes the residents' simple preferences and modest necessities. The petals, which have a greenish hue and are closely knitted, symbolize the loyalty and constancy of the residents of Bohol in both good and bad times.
Hero	Francisco Dagohoy		Also known as Francisco Sendrijas, the individual led one of the most longest revolts during the Spanish colonization period, the Dagohoy Rebellion.
Dance	Kuratsa Boholana		
