= College of the Holy Spirit Manila =

Roman Catholic college in Manila, Philippines

- Dalubhasaang Espiritu Santo sa Maynila (Filipino)
- Former name: Holy Ghost School (1913–1965)
- Motto: Veritas in Caritate (Latin)
- Motto in English: Truth in Love
- Type: Private Research Non-profit Basic and Higher education institution
- Active: June 17, 1913–April 20, 2022
- Founder: Missionary Sisters Servants of the Holy Spirit
- Religious affiliation: Roman Catholic (Holy Spirit Sisters)
- Academic affiliations: Mendiola Consortium, PAASCU CEAP SSpS Educational System
- Location: 163 E. Mendiola St, San Miguel, Manila, Metro Manila, Philippines; 14°35′53″N 120°59′40″E
- Gender: Girl's (1913–2005); Co-educational (2005–2022)
- Website: holyspirit.edu.ph
- Location in Manila Location in Metro Manila Location in Luzon Location in the Philippines

The College of the Holy Spirit Manila, or simply CHSM, was a private, Catholic education institution founded and ran by the Missionary Sisters Servants of the Holy Spirit in Manila, Philippines. Founded in 1913, College of the Holy Spirit Manila was established originally as Holy Ghost College through the invitation of then Manila Archbishop Jeremias Harty. Located initially on Legarda Street, the campus later moved along Mendiola Street, inside the Malacañang Palace Complex. It is one of the schools which comprises the Mendiola Consortium (MC) for academic cooperation along with Centro Escolar University Manila, La Consolacion College Manila, San Beda College Manila, and St. Jude Catholic School.

Initially the school admitted only girls but in 2005 started admitting male students for the high school department and the following year for the college department when the Nursing program decided to accept male students.

In 1957, College of the Holy Spirit Manila became one of the founding charter member of the Philippine Accrediting Association of Schools, Colleges and Universities (PAASCU) to ensure the quality of education. Since then, the college undergoes voluntary accreditation. And the last March 6–7, 2013 the college was re-accredited. CHSM was granted Level III re-accreditation status for arts, sciences and business programs by PAASCU with five years validity until 2018, which deviates to the normal three-year validity.

The school ceased operations in April 2022, citing challenges faced by private education exacerbated by the COVID-19 pandemic.

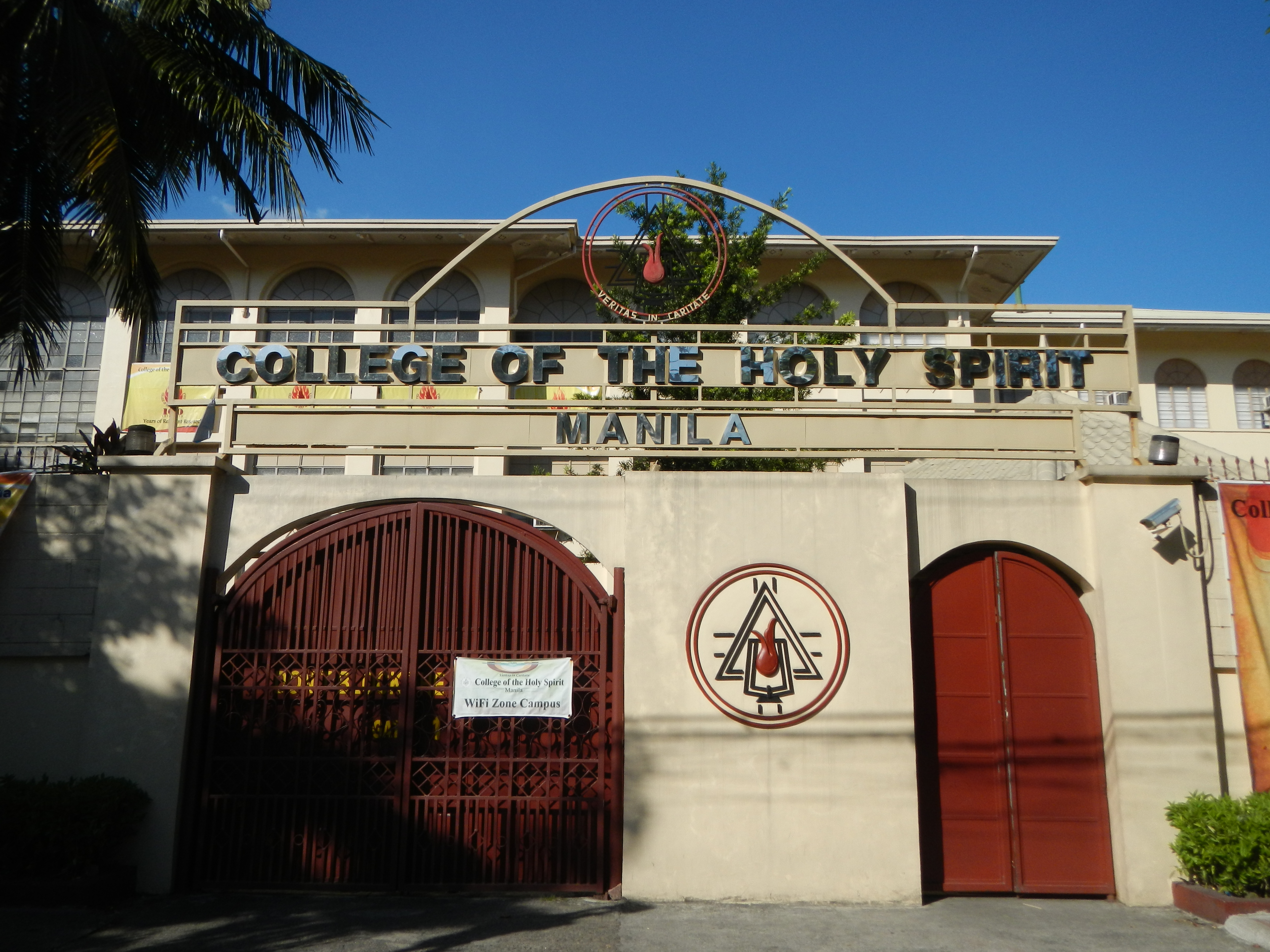
Facade along Mendiola Street

== History ==
The foundation of the College of the Holy Spirit Manila was through a mistaken response to an anonymous letter with a five-dollar bill. The SSpS sisters in Tayum of the province of Abra, Philippines thought it was from then Manila Archbishop Jeremias Harty, and thus sent a letter of gratitude to the Archbishop. The prelate responded that it was not from him but, pleased with the sisters, he invited them to start a free school for the poor street children of Manila. During the period, Archbishop Harty was calling religious orders to establish Catholic schools in Manila to preempt the spread of Protestantism in his archdiocese. Finally, after a year of stay in Tayum, Abra, the pioneer Sisters moved to No. 663 Legarda Street in Manila to establish the Holy Ghost School on June 17, 1913, as a response to the invitation of the Archbishop.

=== Holy Ghost College ===
Five SSpS sisters were sent to a small house in Manila to start the second school of the congregation in the Philippines. Sisters Heronima, Sebastiana, Ludwiga, Laetitia and Gerena gave the nickname Holy Ghost College for their foundation, the Holy Ghost College (HGC). Dubbed by their benefactor Archbishop Harty as "the poorest children of Manila," he donated several furniture for the use of the school.

At the start of the school, it had 23 primary school pupils enrolled in the first semester and during the second semester it grew to 93 students. American Governor-General of the Philippines Francis Burton Harrison through the Division Superintendent of Schools granted Government Recognition and Permit to Operate in 1915. As years went on, enrollment increased such that the Sisters need to rent the neighboring house for them to hold classes. In 1919, there were a total of 274 grade-school pupils.

=== Mendiola property ===
As the school opened the secondary (high school) department, there was a need for expansion. Thus, the 12,000-square-meter present campus located on the intersections of E. Mendiola Street, J.P Laurel Street, and C. Aguila Street was bought on July 7, 1920. With the buildings already constructed, the school was moved to the Mendiola property on March 25, 1922.

In 1924, HGC became the Provincial Motherhouse of the SSpS congregation in the Philippines until it was finally moved in Poinsettia Street, New Manila, Quezon City in 1945.

The first batch of high school students graduated in March 1924. On April 2, 1925, the college department started when it was given government recognition to operate with a two-year course, Associate in Art. In 1928, three Bachelor's Degree programs were offered: Liberal Arts, Preparatory Law, and Education. In 1932, it added BS Home Economics and BA Fine Arts and, in 1936, BS Commerce and the Secretarial Course. Two years later, the Master of Arts in Education was introduced in 1938.

During the Japanese occupation of the Philippines in 1941, the school operation was interrupted when the Japanese Army requisitioned some of the school's buildings. When schooling resumed in 1943, the classes were crammed in the remaining buildings and some neighbor houses. In 1944, Bachelor of Music was offered with various majors through the years: piano, organ, violin, marimba, voice, and others. After the war, new buildings were constructed as student population grew more: Elementary Building (1947), Paraclete Auditorium (1948), Canteen (1949), College Building (1956), College Building-Annex (1961–62), the College Library Annex (1964), New Elementary Building (1966), and the College Cafeteria (1970).

The college department continued to offer new courses. Thus, five major academic departments were formed in 1951, namely, Liberal Arts Education, Home Economics (later changed to Nutrition and Dietetics), Fine Arts, Commerce, and Science. During the 1950s, maintaining that there was need for a higher level of collegiate excellence than that required by the Bureau of Education, 11 Catholic Educational Association of the Philippines (CEAP) institutions, HGC being one of them, spearheaded a voluntary accreditation. Thus, in 1957, HGC underwent its first survey visit for accreditation and became a charter and founding member of the Philippine Accrediting Association of Schools, Colleges and Universities (PAASCU). The Science Department opened three more courses in 1963: BS in Medical Technology, Pre-Nursing, and Pre-Medicine. During the celebration of its Golden Jubilee in 1963, the college made major curricular changes. Some degree programs were phased out while new major fields in the basic programs were introduced.

=== Closure ===
In a statement dated November 22, 2020, the school has announced that it will cease operations at the end of the academic year 2021–2022, with non-graduating students (Levels K to Grade 11, and 1st to 3rd Year College) no longer admitted on that academic year. In a letter to the community dated October 28, 2020, Sr. Carmelita Victoria of the SSpS congregation cited K-12 curriculum policies by the government, free tuition in local and state-run institutions, and increased salaries of public school teachers as the challenges being faced with private education, which are further exacerbated by the COVID-19 pandemic. A portion of the campus, including the gymnasium, has been leased out to National University, which relocated its college of business administration to the CHS site. In June 2024, the SSpS congregation signed a five-year lease agreement with the National Teachers College for the usage of St. Arnold Janssen building and a portion of the former Social Hall at the ground floor.

== Academic programs ==
The college offers academic programs for high school, undergraduate courses, post-graduate degrees and short-term certificate programs. The undergraduate programs include course in Arts and Education, Business, Fine Arts and Health Sciences. Post-graduate courses include master's degree in Business Administration, Business Administration for Health Professionals, Tourism and Hospitality Management, Guidance and Counseling, and Special Education. The school also offers professional courses in Special Education, Caregiver Program and Women Leadership. Starting in the 2013 school year, it also opened two new short courses in Digital Arts and Gerontology.

== Administration ==
For most of its history, the school was administered by SSpS religious sisters. A noted deviation from tradition is alumna Felina Co-Young who on June 11, 2011, was appointed by the SSpS Philippines North Provincial Leadership as the first lay woman president of the college.

== Reception ==
The college has received Level III Accreditation, the second highest possible level, from the Philippine Accrediting Association of Schools, Colleges, and Universities (PAASCU). It was granted full autonomous status by the Commission on Higher Education of the Philippines in 2003. It received the National Consumers Quality Award as the Top Exclusive Catholic School for Girls in 2003.

== Notable alumni ==
- Tessie Aquino-Oreta – former Senator and Congresswoman of Malabon
- Maxelende Ganade – musician and composer of "Awit sa Bohol", the official provincial hymn of the province of Bohol, Philippines
- Victoria Garchitorena - politician
- Carmen Planas - politician
- Mari-Jo P. Ruiz – mathematician
- Chiqui Somes – 1963 Miss Philippines 1st runner-up
- Alice Guillermo – art historian and critic

== See also ==
- College of the Holy Spirit of Tarlac
- Holy Spirit School of Tagbilaran
- Holy Trinity Academy in Loay, Bohol
