= Mendiola Consortium =

Academic cooperative organization in Manila

- Established: 1974
- Type: Academic cooperation
- Location: San Miguel, Manila, Philippines
- Members: 5

Mendiola Consortium (MC) is an educational organization of five institutions located along the street of Mendiola in Manila, Philippines. It was founded on July 16, 1974, upon the invitation of then Centro Escolar University President Dionisio Tiongco to the heads of San Beda University, College of the Holy Spirit and La Consolacion College Manila.

They agreed to unite their resources to enhance the capability of providing quality education and public service, and to participate more effectively in the attainment of national development. It is through the MC schools that Mendiola street have become a peace zone since it was traditionally a site of rallies because of its proximity to Malacañan Palace.

== Member institutions ==
- Centro Escolar University
- La Consolacion College Manila
- San Beda University
- Saint Jude Catholic School

Former members:

- College of the Holy Spirit (closed in 2022)
