= Awit sa Bohol =

Provincial anthem of Bohol

English: Bohol Hymn
- Provincial anthem of Bohol, Philippines
- Lyrics: Justino Romea (original English lyrics), 1970
- Music: Justino Romea, 1970
- Adopted: September 24, 1970 (original lyrics and music); September 13, 1974 (official Boholano lyrics)

Audio sample
- Awit sa Bohol (1974): file; help

"Awit sa Bohol" (Boholano for 'Song of Bohol'), also known as the "Bohol Hymn", is the official anthem of the province of Bohol in the Philippines.

== History ==
The song was composed by Justino Romea of Loon, a columnist for the Bohol Chronicle and a teacher at the Bohol School of Arts and Trades (now the Bohol Island State University), with Romea also writing the hymn's original English lyrics. Commissioned by Governor Lino Chatto, it was first played on March 1, 1970 by an all-female choir of the College of the Holy Spirit (now the Holy Spirit School of Tagbilaran) as the provincial flag was being raised during the opening ceremony for the East Visayan Athletic Association Games in Tagbilaran, the provincial capital. Later that year on September 24, 1970, the Bohol Provincial Board passed Resolution No. 215, making the song the official hymn of Bohol.

A few years later, the provincial government launched a competition to translate the song's lyrics into Boholano, with the winning entry being written by lyricist and composer Maxelende Ganade. Ganade's lyrics were subsequently adopted by the Provincial Board with the passage of Resolution No. 151 on September 13, 1974.

== Lyrics ==
While "Awit sa Bohol" has official English and Boholano lyrics, and the song is normally performed in Boholano, the Eskaya cultural minority also have a version of the provincial anthem in their language, Eskayan. However, unlike the English and Boholano versions, the Eskayan version is unofficial.

Original English version
Bohol Hymn (1970)
penned by Justino Romea
Official Boholano version
Awit sa Bohol (1974)
translated by Maxelende Ganade
Translation of the Boholano version
Bohol Hymn
translated by the Loonanon Pioneers of America
Unofficial Eskayan version

This is the land I love,
The land God gave to me,
Caressed by the sun,
Bathed by the sea,
And kissed by the cool breeze
Night and day.
Here’s where the early heroes lived,
Here’s where they wrought peace
and here they bled,
Here rise the marvelous cone-shaped hills,
Here’s sweet kinampay grows.

Blessed with white sandy beaches,
Rivers that water valleys,
Seas teem with fishes and cows graze
on the plains,
In ev’ry home love reigns,
God keep my homeland always free,
Let her forever be,
I pledge my strength, my heart and soul,
To my dear home, Bohol.

Yuta kong minahal,
Hatag ni Bathala;
Sa adlaw’g gabi-i,
Taknang tanan
Dinasig sa kinaiyahan
Sa mga bayaning yutawhan
Imong kalinaw gi-ampingan
Lungsod sa bungtod nga matunhay
Ug matam-is nga kinampay

Puti ang kabaybayunan
Walog sa suba binisbisan
Bahandi sa dagat ug kapatagan
Gugma ang tuburan
Sa kagawasan sa tanan
Panalanginan ka
Ihalad ko lawas ug kalag
Sa mutya kong Bohol.

My beloved Motherland,
Given by God;
Day and night,
In every moment
Blest by the greatness
Of the heroes of its people
Your peace is what we treasure
A village set on a high hill
And it’s sweet purple potato

On white sandy shores
Nourished by the rivers
The richness of the sea and the plains
Love is the source
For everyone’s freedom
I pray to you
As I offer my body and soul
For my beloved Bohol.

Samnat yo bantelar,
Datong con Bathala,
Ya abeya cloper meboy secwes
Nemte ya chdid loning
Ya moy beresa gui
Samnat eclabolto
Gona yonoy dokerkedo
Bentod ya hondog yel moy sebar
Chda a chdiam yel keman pay

Edlac esto mesesabla
Lo-ya bac Lobor,
Chdire esto ebetangke chda loreker
Parong esto topete
Ya droser, ya secwes
Do-o moy sam
Tewergoyo asado chda carna
Ya lacyo booy.

The lyrics of the song have been interpreted as being a strong statement of Boholanos' commitment to their culture, history and environment.

== Performance ==
Singing "Awit sa Bohol" is mandatory whenever there is an official event being held in the province of Bohol.

In 2017, after noticing that the Department of Education began implementing it in schools, Governor Edgar Chatto mandated the performance of "The ASEAN Way", the anthem of the Association of Southeast Asian Nations, in government offices throughout the province, which is to be performed after "Lupang Hinirang" (the National Anthem), "Awit sa Bohol" and, if so required, the municipal hymn.
