= Flag of Southern Leyte =

Southern Leyte
- Use: State flag
- Proportion: 13:25
- Adopted: ca. 1970s

The Flag of Southern Leyte is the provincial flag of Southern Leyte, Philippines. It is a green field with thin white horizontal and vertical stripes meeting within the upper hoist quarter of the flag to form an offset cross; upon this cross is a wreath composed of an abaca (Manila hemp) leaf and a palm frond, while four "Star of Leyte" orchid flowers are set in a descending diagonal line from the cross intersection to the lower fly.

The flag was adopted sometime in the mid-1970s to early 1980s, when Ferdinand Marcos was promoting his "Bagong Lipunan" (New Society) vision. It is one of the few provincial flags of the Philippines which deviate from the common design, i.e., a plain field with the provincial seal in the center.

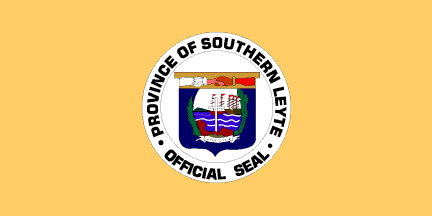
Older Southern Leyte flag

== Symbolism ==
- The green field represents agriculture, the primary industry of the province.
- The golden fringe represents hope and prayer for bountiful harvests in the midst of unpredictable natural events.
- The cross alludes to the province's most significant historical event: the first Catholic mass in the Philippines, which is widely thought to have been celebrated in Limasawa.
- The coconut palm frond and abaca leaf represent the province's most important agricultural products.
- The four Phalaenopsis x intermedia ("Star of Leyte") orchid flowers, which are endemic to the province, represent the four major geographical divisions of the province:
  - Maasin—Macrohon—Padre Burgos area (also includes Limasawa, which was part of Padre Burgos until 1989)
  - Sogod Bay area — Bontoc, Libagon, Malitbog, Sogod and Tomas Oppus
  - Pacific area — Anahawan, Hinunangan, Hinundayan, Saint Bernard, San Juan and Silago
  - Panaon area — Liloan, Pintuyan, San Francisco and San Ricardo

== See also ==
- Southern Leyte
- Flags of the Philippine provinces
