= Mari-Jo P. Ruiz =

Filipina mathematician

Mari-Jo P. Ruiz (1943–2022) was a Filipina mathematician and professor of mathematics at Ateneo de Manila University. Ruiz specialized in graph theory and operations research.

== Education and career ==
Ruiz grew up in Manila, and was educated at College of the Holy Spirit Manila. She graduated from Marymount Manhattan College in New York City in 1963, and soon afterward completed a master's degree at New York University. She joined the Ateneo de Manila faculty in 1965, eight years before the school began accepting women as students. She chose academia over a competing job offer from industry because at the time it paid slightly better. She acquired the nickname "Mustang Mary" at this time, because of the Ford Mustang that she drove.

Ruiz completed her PhD at Ateneo in 1981. At Ateneo, she served as chair of mathematics, chair of management engineering, dean of arts and sciences, and trustee. She retired to become a professor emeritus in 2009. She died on 29 December 2022 at the age of 79.

== Book ==
With Jin Akiyama, she was the author of the book A Day’s Adventure in Math Wonderland (World Scientific, 2008; translated into 7 other languages).

== Recognition ==
The College of the Holy Spirit Alumnae Foundation gave Ruiz their Distinguished Alumna in Education Award in 2001. In 2014, Ateneo gave Ruiz their Lux-in-Domino Award.
