= Enrique Mendiola =

Filipino educator and politician (1859–1914)

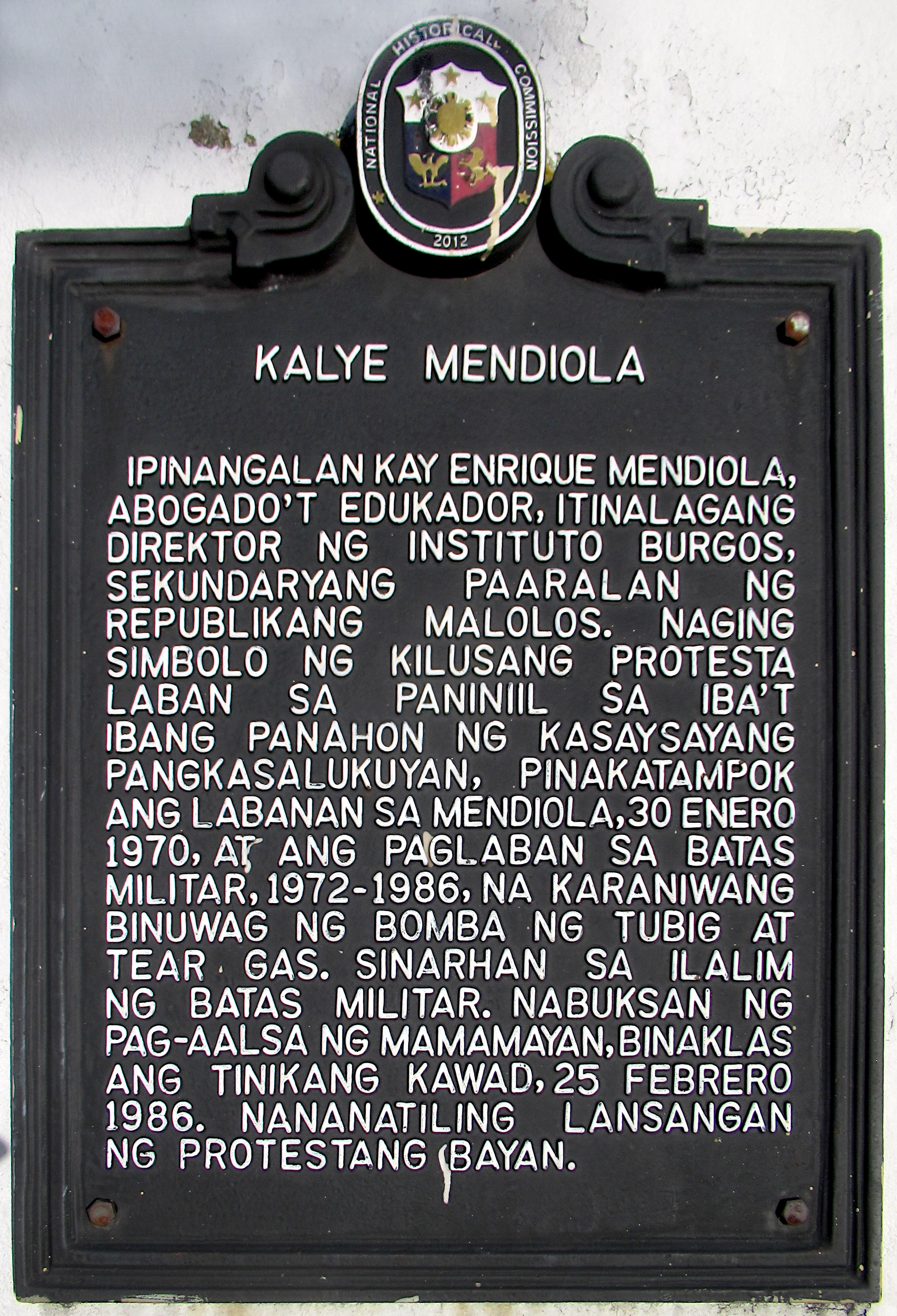
Historical marker of Mendiola Street

Enrique José Mendiola y Victorino (3 May 1859 — 30 March 1914) was a Filipino educator, author of textbooks and politician who advocated for the right to education in the Philippines. He has been alluded to as the "Educator of the Philippine Revolution".

== Early life and education ==
Enrique Mendiola was born on May 3, 1859 in San Miguel, Manila, son of Quintín Mendiola, a blacksmith, and María Escolástica Victorino.

He graduated with a Bachelor of Arts from Manila's Colegio de San Juan de Letran. He began teaching after graduating from the University of Santo Tomas in law and later completed a course in philosophy and literature.

== Founder of schools ==
Mendiola founded the school named La Invención de la Santa Cruz (translation: The Invention of the Holy Cross) on Ongpin Street in Binondo, Manila — one among the first and unique schools administered by Filipinos at that time. This school offered education from elementary to high school. In the second semester of the academic year 1898-1899, the school began offering English language courses under an American teacher.

Mendiola became the director of the Instituto Burgos school established by the Philippine revolutionary government in Malolos, Bulacan, and after that, during the United States occupation of the Philippines, he founded the school, Liceo de Manila together with other prominent figures of the Revolution. The President of the United States, Theodore Roosevelt, recognized and warmly congratulated Mendiola in a historic letter, for his important contributions in the field of education.

== Legacy ==
Enrique Mendiola was appointed as the first member of the Board of Regents of the newly established University of the Philippines. His pioneering work in the field of education in the Philippines is honorably mentioned by the National Artist for Historical Literature Carlos Quirino in his book of greats in Philippine history.

=== Mendiola Street ===
Mendiola died on 30 March 1914, and Mendiola Street, the historic thoroughfare approaching the Malacanang Presidential Palace in Manila's University Belt (of which includes portions of San Miguel), was later named after him.

Enrique Mendiola Street, in honor of the Educator of the Philippine Revolution

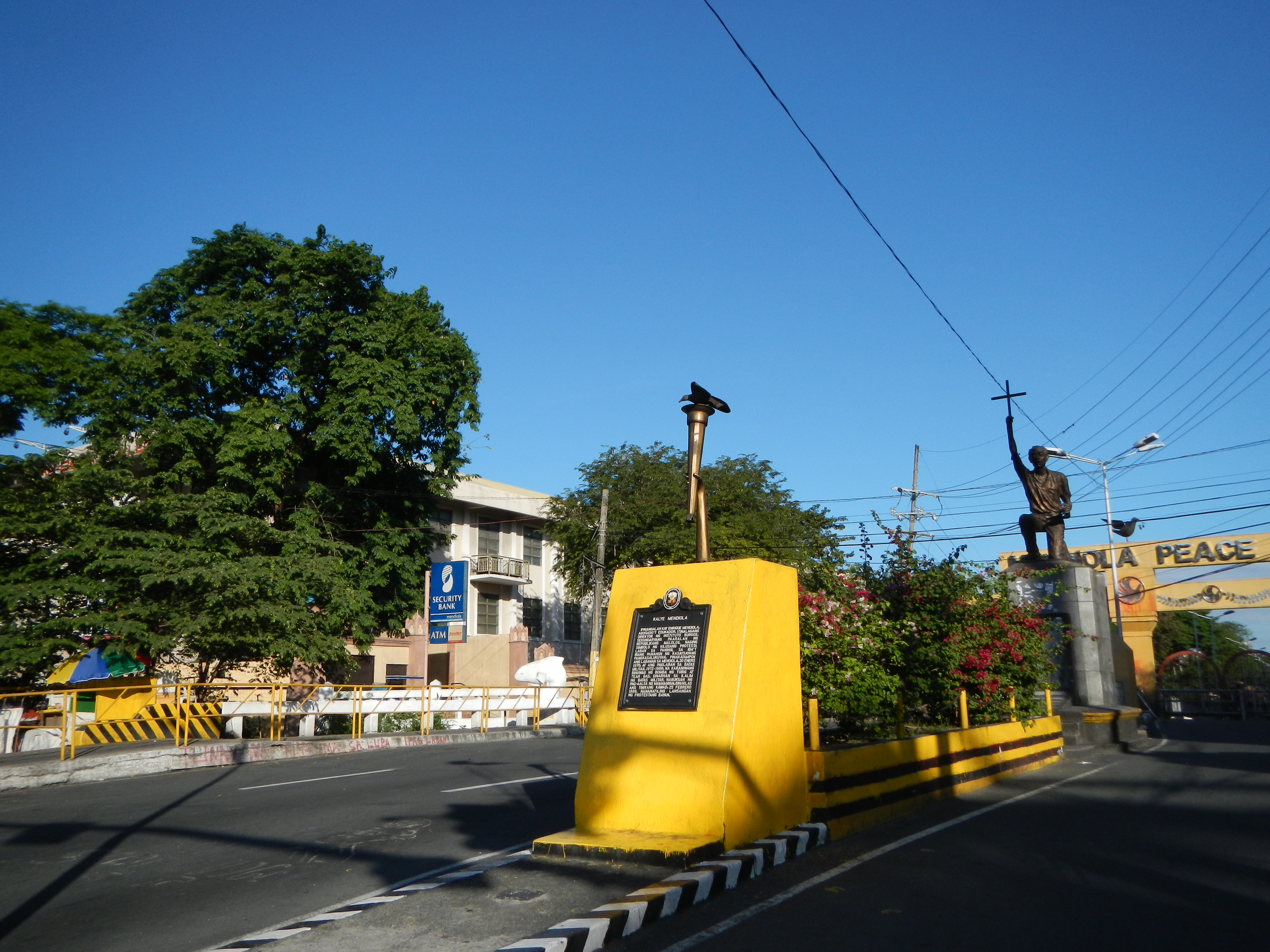

== Books authored by Enrique Mendiola ==
This list may become longer.

- Programa de Gramática Castellana (1892) (translation: Spanish Grammar Program), a textbook for a first course in Spanish grammar
- Programa de Gramática Castellana y Latina (1893) (translation: Spanish and Latin Grammar Program)
- Programa de Historia Universal (1892) (translation: Universal History Program)
- El Instructor Filipino (1898) (translation: The Filipino Instructor)
- Doctrina Civil (1901), written with Ignacio B. Villamor (translation: Civil Doctrine)
- A Puntes Sobre la Historia de Filipinas (1910) (translation:Notes on the History of the Philippines)
- Principios de moral y educacion civica (1910) (translation:Principles of morality and civic education)
