= Flags of the provinces of the Philippines =

The flags of the provinces of the Philippines are the vexillological devices used by various provincial-level local government units (LGUs) of the country.

== Designs ==
The most common provincial flag design is a plain field of a single color with the provincial seal placed in the center; of this design the most prevalent field color used is white, followed by shades of yellow, of green and of blue. Some of these plain flags have additional text above and/or below the seal, usually involving the province name.

Several provincial flags deviate from the default design: some are horizontal or vertical tribands, usually employing three different colors (i.e., a tricolor); some also use charges derived from elements within provincial seals, instead of using the entire provincial seal.

== Usage ==
Most of the provincial flags, by virtue of bearing the corporate seal of the LGU, are solely intended to represent the provincial government wherever they are displayed, and not meant to be adopted by the public for general use. Such government flags only find usage within provincial government premises (e.g., provincial capitol grounds; provincial government office spaces such as that of the governor; Sangguniang Panlalawigan chambers; or provincially-owned sports or recreational facilities) and are most visible to the public during events involving the provincial government. The designs of many of these government flags can be easily changed between administrations, especially when the provincial seal itself is altered (e.g., Ilocos Norte; Marinduque); at times they reflect the personal preferences of the provincial governor in power (e.g., use of the blue flag for Laguna during the term of Emilio Ejercito from 2010 to 2014; use of "Oriental Negros" in the provincial flag and seal during the term of George Arnaiz from 2004 to 2007).

The flags of some provinces have provincial board (PB) or Sangguniang Panlalawigan (SP) resolutions or ordinances specifying their designs and specifications; therefore the modification of these flags will require amending or repealing previous legal enactments made by the provincial legislative body. Some flags with legally specified designs, such as those of Bohol, Bukidnon and Southern Leyte, are allowed to be adopted by the general public as a symbol of civic pride for the province, and thus serve dual purpose as both a government and a civic flag.

At least two provinces — Camarines Norte and South Cotabato — maintain two vastly different official flag designs: one for exclusive government use (i.e., a plain white flag with the provincial seal in the center) and another for civic use.

== List of current provincial flags ==
Region	Province	Image	Flag Description	Date of Adoption or First Use [Legal Basis]
CAR	Abra		Plain green field with the provincial seal in the center. Flag proportion is approximately 2:3.	
Region 13 (Caraga)	Agusan del Norte		Plain golden yellow field with the provincial seal in the center. Flag proportion is approximately 2:3. Governor's office version: Plain golden yellow field, centered within which are the provincial seal and a line of text in black serif typeface ("AGUSAN DEL NORTE") below the seal; this flag's proportion is approximately 1:2.	
Region 13 (Caraga)	Agusan del Sur		Plain yellow field with the provincial seal in the center. Flag proportion of the most common outdoor flag variant is 2:3.	
Region 6 (Western Visayas)	Aklan		Governor's office (gold) version [left, top]: Plain golden yellow field, centered within which are the provincial seal and a line of text in black sans serif typeface ("PROVINCE OF AKLAN") set in a wide arc above the seal. Flag proportion is approximately 2:3. Sangguniang Panlalawigan chamber (white) version [left, bottom]: Plain white field with the provincial seal in the center; flag proportion is approximately 2:3.	
Region 5 (Bicol)	Albay		Plain white field with the provincial seal in the center. Flag proportion of the most authoritative variant [left, top] is 1:2. Governor's office version [left, bottom]: Plain white field, centered within which are the provincial seal and a line of text in red sans serif typeface ("PROVINCE OF ALBAY") below the seal; this flag's proportion is approximately 1:2.	
Region 6 (Western Visayas)	Antique		Plain deep green field with the provincial seal in the center. Flag proportion of the most authoritative variant is approximately 3:5.	
CAR	Apayao		Plain golden yellow field, centered within which are the provincial seal and a line of text in green serif typeface ("PROVINCE OF APAYAO") below the seal. Flag proportion is approximately 2:3.	
Region 3 (Central Luzon)	Aurora		Plain green field with the provincial seal in the center. Flag proportion is approximately 1:2.	ca. 2015
BARMM	Basilan		Plain green field green field with the provincial seal set on the upper hoist and the Seal of the Bangsamoro Autonomous Region in Muslim Mindanao on the upper fly. Words in white color and rendered in various sans serif (Arial) typefaces appear in the lower half of the flag; the text is split into three lines: PROVINCIAL GOVERNMENT // OF // BASILAN. Flag proportion is approximately 2:3.	
Region 3 (Central Luzon)	Bataan		Plain white field with the provincial seal in the center. Flag proportion is approximately 1:2.	
Region 2 (Cagayan Valley)	Batanes		Plain maroon field with the provincial seal in the center. Flag proportion of the most authoritative variant is approximately 1:2.	current seal: ca. 1995
Region 4-A (Calabarzon)	Batangas		Main article: Flag of Batangas Horizontal tricolor of royal blue (top), white (middle) and red (bottom) stripes, with the escutcheon from the provincial seal in the center. Official flag proportion is 1:2.	December 8, 2023
CAR	Benguet		Plain white field with the provincial seal in the center. Most common flag proportion is 1:2.	
Region 8 (Eastern Visayas)	Biliran		Plain navy blue with the provincial seal in the center. Flag proportion is approximately 1:2.	
Region 7 (Central Visayas)	Bohol		Main article: Flag of Bohol Vertical tricolor of navy blue (hoist), white (middle) and red (fly) panels, with a central charge — consisting of a tableau of the Sandugo enclosed by the Chocolate Hills and two swords, plus a blue five-pointed star fimbriated yellow (always on the observer's right, even in the reverse side) — all contained in the white panel. Official flag proportion is 1:2.	1971 [Provincial Board Res. No. 121]
Region 10 (Northern Mindanao)	Bukidnon		Main article: Flag of Bukidnon Horizontal tricolor of white (top), red (middle) and black (bottom), charged in the center with a golden emblem consisting of a spear pointing downward toward the fly, and a shield bearing the stylized profile of the Kitanglad mountain range. Official flag dimensions are 34 inches in width and 64 inches in length, or a flag proportion of 17:32.	
Region 3 (Central Luzon)	Bulacan		Plain green field with the provincial seal in the center. Most common flag proportion is 1:2.	
Region 2 (Cagayan Valley)	Cagayan		Main article: Cagayan § Flag Horizontal tricolor of navy blue (top), golden yellow (middle) and green (bottom), charged with the provincial shield ringed by 29 white, five-pointed stars, all placed toward the hoist. Official flag proportion is 1:2.	11 March 1970 [Provincial Board Res. No. 319]
Region 5 (Bicol)	Camarines Norte		Government flag [left, top]: Plain white field with the provincial seal in the center; government flag's proportion is approximately 1:2. Civil flag [left, bottom]: Vertical tricolor of green (hoist), white (middle) and yellow (fly); civic flag's proportion is approximately 1:2.	
Region 5 (Bicol)	Camarines Sur		Plain royal blue field with the provincial seal in the center. Flag proportion is approximately 1:2.	
Region 10 (Northern Mindanao)	Camiguin		Plain green field with a modified version of the provincial seal in the center. Flag proportion is approximately 1:2.	
Region 6 (Western Visayas)	Capiz		Plain light blue field with the provincial seal in the center. Most common flag proportion is approximately 1:2.	
Region 5 (Bicol)	Catanduanes		Plain green field with the provincial seal in the center. Most common flag proportion is 1:2.	
Region 4-A (Calabarzon)	Cavite		Plain white field with the provincial seal in the center. Most common flag proportion is 1:2.	
Region 7 (Central Visayas)	Cebu		Plain yellow field with the provincial seal in the center. Flag proportion of the most authoritative indoor variant [left, top] is approximately 1:2 while the outdoor variant [left, bottom] is approximately 3:5.	
Region 12 (Soccsksargen)	Cotabato		Plain white field with the provincial seal in the center. Flag proportion is 4:5.	current flag: ca. 2018 current seal: 2014
Region 11 (Davao Region)	Davao de Oro		Sepia brown field with the provincial seal in the center.	current flag: March 2020 current seal: January 2020
Region 11 (Davao Region)	Davao del Norte		Plain light blue field with the provincial seal in the center. Most common flag proportion is 1:2.	
Region 11 (Davao Region)	Davao del Sur		Plain royal blue field with the provincial seal in the center. Most common flag proportion is 1:2.	
Region 11 (Davao Region)	Davao Occidental		Plain green field with the provincial seal, itself placed over a yellow five-rayed sun, in the center. Two lines of white text surround the seal and sun: above, set in a wide arc, are the words "PROVINCE OF DAVAO OCCIDENTAL" written in a large serif typeface, while below, in a straight line, are the words "OFFICIAL SEAL" written in a sans serif typeface. Flag proportion is approximately 4:7.	current flag: 2017 current seal: 2016
Region 11 (Davao Region)	Davao Oriental		Plain navy blue field with the provincial seal in the center. Flag proportion is 2:3.	
Region 13 (Caraga)	Dinagat Islands		Plain white field with the provincial seal in the center. Flag proportion of the most authoritative variant is approximately 2:3.	
Region 8 (Eastern Visayas)	Eastern Samar		Vertical tricolor of navy blue (hoist), white (middle) and red (fly) panels, with the provincial seal centered within the white panel. Flag proportion is approximately 1:2.	
Region 6 (Western Visayas)	Guimaras		Plain golden yellow field with the provincial seal in the center. Flag proportion is approximately 1:2.	
CAR	Ifugao		Plain royal blue field with the provincial seal in the center. Flag proportion is approximately 11:18.	
Region 1 (Ilocos Region)	Ilocos Norte		Plain white field with the provincial seal in the center. Most common flag proportion is 1:2.	current seal: 13 June 2011 [SP Ordinance No. 30]
Region 1 (Ilocos Region)	Ilocos Sur		Plain burgundy field with the provincial seal in the center. Flag proportion is approximately 3:5.	
Region 6 (Western Visayas)	Iloilo		Plain white field with the provincial seal in the center. Flag proportion is approximately 1:2.	
Region 2 (Cagayan Valley)	Isabela		Plain green field with the provincial seal in the center. Flag proportion of the most authoritative variant is approximately 6:11.	
CAR	Kalinga		Plain white field with the provincial seal in the center. Flag proportion of the most recent variant is 2:3.	
Region 1 (Ilocos Region)	La Union		Plain white field with the provincial seal in the center. Most common flag proportion is 1:2.	
Region 4-A (Calabarzon)	Laguna		Yellow field with the provincial shield in the center. Set in a wide arc above the shield are the words "SAGISAG NG LALAWIGAN NG LAGUNA" written in dark green. Below the shield are four five-pointed stars, thinly fimbriated dark green and arranged in a straight line. Most common flag proportion is 1:2.	restoration of current flag: ca. June 2014
Region 10 (Northern Mindanao)	Lanao del Norte		Plain golden yellow field with the provincial seal in the center. Flag proportion is approximately 4:7.	
BARMM	Lanao del Sur		Plain golden yellow field with the provincial seal in the center. Flag proportion is approximately 7:10.	
Region 8 (Eastern Visayas)	Leyte		Horizontal tricolor of navy blue (top), white (middle) and red (bottom), with the provincial seal (fimbriated white) in the center of the flag. Flag proportion of the most authoritative variant is approximately 5:7.	
BARMM	Maguindanao Del Norte		Plain white field with the Provincial Seal in the center	2022–2023
BARMM	Maguindanao del Sur		Plain white field with the Provincial Seal in the center	2022–2023
Region 4-B (Mimaropa)	Marinduque		Plain green field with the provincial seal in the center. Flag proportion of most recent variant is approximately 2:3.	
Region 5 (Bicol Region)	Masbate		Plain very light blue field with the provincial seal in the center, flanked by to the left and right by the numbers “19” and “01,” both rendered in white, respectively. Flag proportion is approximately 2:3.	ca. 2014
Region 10 (Northern Mindanao)	Misamis Occidental		Plain golden yellow field with the provincial seal in the center. Flag proportion is approximately 1:2.	
Region 10 (Northern Mindanao)	Misamis Oriental		Plain white field with the provincial seal in the center. Flag proportion is approximately 1:2.	
CAR	Mountain Province		Plain golden yellow field with the provincial seal in the center. Flag proportion of most authoritative variant is approximately 9:16.	
NIR (Negros Island Region)	Negros Occidental		Plain light blue field with the provincial seal in the center. Flag proportion of most authoritative variant is approximately 2:3.	
NIR (Negros Island Region)	Negros Oriental		Plain navy blue field with the provincial seal in the center. Flag proportion of most authoritative variant is approximately 1:2.	
Region 8 (Eastern Visayas)	Northern Samar		Plain orange field with the provincial seal in the center. Flag proportion of most authoritative variant is approximately 1:2.	
Region 3 (Central Luzon)	Nueva Ecija		Plain white field with the provincial seal in the center. Flag proportion of most authoritative variant is approximately 7:10.	
Region 2 (Cagayan Valley)	Nueva Vizcaya		Indoor flag [left]: Horizontal bicolor with the provincial seal in the center; flag proportion is approximately 11:20. Outdoor flag: Plain field with the provincial seal in the center — green on obverse side, yellow on reverse; flag proportion is approximately 1:2.	
Region 4-B (Mimaropa)	Occidental Mindoro		Plain white field with the provincial seal in the center. Flag proportion is approximately 1:2.	
Region 4-B (Mimaropa)	Oriental Mindoro		Plain white field with the provincial seal in the center. Flag proportion of most visible variant [left, top] is approximately 1:2. Sangguniang Panlalawigan chamber version [left, bottom]: Plain white field, centered within which are the provincial seal and a line of text in red serif typeface ("LALAWIGAN NG SILANGANG MINDORO") below the seal; this flag's proportion is approximately 7:10.	
Region 4-B (Mimaropa)	Palawan		Plain golden yellow field with the provincial seal in the center. Flag proportion of most authoritative variant is approximately 1:2.	
Region 3 (Central Luzon)	Pampanga		Plain white field with the provincial seal in the center. Flag proportion of most authoritative variant is approximately 3:7.	
Region 1 (Ilocos Region)	Pangasinan		Plain golden yellow (officially termed “yellow santan”) field with the provincial seal in the center. Official flag dimensions are 36 inches in width and 56 inches in length, or a flag proportion of 9:14.	20 February 2017 [SP Ordinance No. 206-2017]
Region 4-A (Calabarzon)	Quezon		Plain royal blue field with the provincial seal in the center. Flag proportion is approximately 4:7.	
Region 2 (Cagayan Valley)	Quirino		Plain orange field with the provincial seal in the center. Flag proportion of most authoritative variant is approximately 1:2.	
Region 4-A (Calabarzon)	Rizal		Plain light blue field with the provincial seal in the center. Flag proportion of most authoritative variant is approximately 1:2.	
Region 4-B (Mimaropa)	Romblon		Plain white field with the provincial seal in the center. Flag proportion is approximately 2:3.	
Region 8 (Eastern Visayas)	Samar		Plain white field bordered golden yellow, with the provincial seal in the center. Flag proportion is approximately 3:5.	
Region 12 (Soccsksargen)	Sarangani		Plain white field, centered within which are the provincial seal and a line of text in black sans serif typeface ("SARANGANI PROVINCE") above the seal. Flag proportion is approximately 3:5.	
NIR (Negros Island Region)	Siquijor		Plain lime green field with the provincial seal in the center. Flag proportion is approximately 5:9.	
Region 5 (Bicol)	Sorsogon		An uneven horizontal triband of blue-white-blue with the provincial seal in the center. Flag proportion is approximately 1:2.	October 2019
Region 12 (Soccsksargen)	South Cotabato		Tricolor flag (both for government and civic use) [left, top]: Horizontal bicolor of navy blue (top) and white (bottom), with a golden yellow triangle spanning the width of the hoist, reminiscent of the Philippine flag’s basic design; centered within the triangle is the provincial seal. Flag proportion is approximately 1:2. Simple white flag (only for government use) [left, bottom]: Plain white field with the provincial seal in the center; flag proportion of most authoritative variant is approximately 4:7.	
Region 8 (Eastern Visayas)	Southern Leyte		Main article: Flag of Southern Leyte Green field with thin white horizontal and vertical stripes meeting within the upper hoist quarter of the flag to form an offset cross; upon this cross is a wreath composed of an abaca (Manila hemp) leaf and a palm frond, while four "Star of Leyte" orchid flowers are set in a descending diagonal line from the cross intersection to the lower fly. Flag proportion of the most authoritative variant is approximately 13:25.	ca. 1970s
Region 12 (Soccsksargen)	Sultan Kudarat		White field with elements taken from the provincial seal: a central stylized charge (colored in light green) that combines the alpha-syllabic glyphs “Su” and “Ku” of the pre-Hispanic Baybayin script; both glyphs share one kudlit indicating the vowel /u/.; two elements flanking the central charge: a single upright panicle of rice (colored gold, and always on the left-hand side of the observer); and a single upright frond of African palm, (colored emerald green, and always on the right-hand side of the observer).; two lines of text ("LALAWIGAN NG SULTAN KUDARAT" and "1973"), rendered in black and in a sans serif typeface, both the same font size.; Flag proportion of the most authoritative variant is approximately 2:3.	
Region 9 (Zamboanga Peninsula)	Sulu		Plain green field with the provincial seal in the center. Flag proportion of the most authoritative variant [left, top] is approximately 1:2. The variant flown outdoors by the provincial government [left, bottom] contains "PROVINCE OF SULU" written in white sans serif letters above the seal.	
Region 13 (Caraga)	Surigao del Norte		Plain turquoise blue field with the provincial seal in the center. Flag proportion of the most authoritative variant is approximately 7:15.	
Region 13 (Caraga)	Surigao del Sur		Plain white field with the provincial seal in the center. Flag proportion of the most authoritative variant is approximately 7:10.	
Region 3 (Central Luzon)	Tarlac		Plain white field with the provincial seal in the center. Flag proportion is approximately 6:11.	
BARMM	Tawi-Tawi		Plain golden yellow field, centered within which are elements of the modified provincial seal, plus lines of white text above ("TAWI-TAWI") and below ("PROVINCE"). Flag proportion of the most recent variant is approximately 5:7.	
Region 3 (Central Luzon)	Zambales		Plain white field with the provincial seal in the center. Flag proportion is approximately 1:2.	
Region 9 (Zamboanga Peninsula)	Zamboanga del Norte		Plain golden yellow field with the provincial seal in the center. Flag proportion of the most authoritative variant is approximately 9:17.	
Region 9 (Zamboanga Peninsula)	Zamboanga del Sur		Plain golden yellow field, centered within which are the provincial seal, plus a line of black text ("PROVINCIAL GOVERNMENT") in sans serif typeface. Flag proportion of the most authoritative variant [left, top] is approximately 11:20. Sangguniang Panlalawigan chamber (white) version [left, bottom]: Plain white field with the provincial seal in the center; this flag's proportion is approximately 3:5.	
Region 9 (Zamboanga Peninsula)	Zamboanga Sibugay		Plain white field with the provincial seal in the center. Flag proportion is approximately 1:2.	

== Flags of former provinces ==
Region	Province	Image	Flag Description	Date of Adoption or First Use [Legal Basis]
BARMM	Maguindanao		Plain green field with the provincial seal in the center. Most common flag proportion is 2:3.	

== See also ==
- List of flags of the Philippines
