= Flag of Bukidnon =

Flag of a province of the Philippines

Bukidnon
- Use: State flag
- Proportion: 17:32

The Flag of Bukidnon is the provincial flag of Bukidnon, Philippines. It is a horizontal triband of white, red and black, charged in the center with a yellow emblem consisting of a spear pointing downward toward the fly, and a shield which itself is charged with the stylized profile of the Kitanglad mountain range. The size of the flag is declared to be 34 inches by 64 inches, giving the flag a width-to-length proportion of 17:32. Bukidnon is one of the few Philippine provinces to have a flag whose design deviates from the standard provincial seal on a colored field.

== Symbolism ==
The Provincial Government of Bukidnon provides the symbolism of the flag's various elements as follows:

Main flag field:

  - The three equal horizontal stripes represent the hospitability, heroism and nobility of Bukidnons, and expressing Bukidnon sentiments for quality, freedom, justice and peace.
  - White color — represents honesty and purity
  - Red color — represents commerce, courage, bravery and heroism
  - Black color — represents authority

Central emblem:

- Spear and shield — represent the traditional weapon of the natives for self-defense
- Yellow color — represents nobility
- Pointed shape of the upper portion of the shield — represents the mountain ranges which harbor natural resources (e.g. wildlife, flora, fauna, mineral deposits, etc.) and serve as natural defenses of the province
- Pointed shape of the lower portion of the shield — represents the scenic canyons (e.g. Mangima, Atugan and Kulaman Canyons) which also serve as natural defenses of the province
- Parallel lines forming the border of the shield — represent the river banks from which native Bukidnon ethnic groups derive their respective names (e.g. Pulangions, Tigwahonons, etc.)
- Circular charge with stylized mountain profile — represents the Mount Kitanglad mountain range, the province's most distinctive landmark.

== Municipalities and Cities ==
Most flags of the municipalities of Bukidnon adhere to the common design of a monochrome field charged with their official seal in the center. However, there are some that uses a different design.

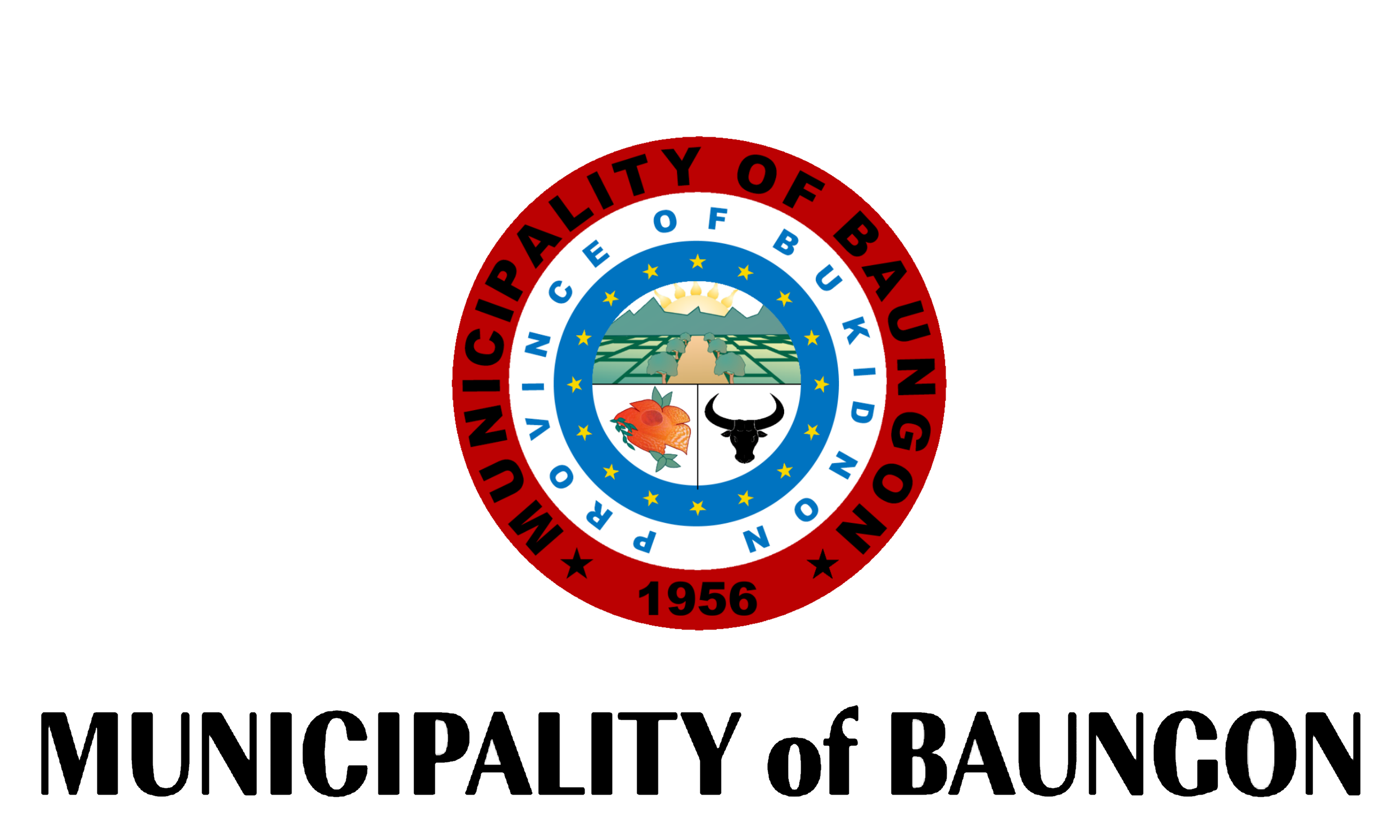
Baungon

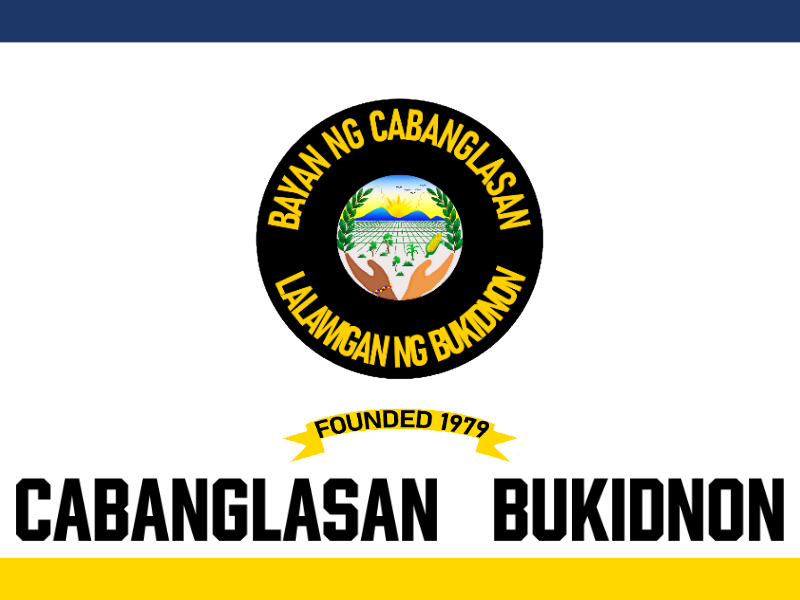
Cabanglasan

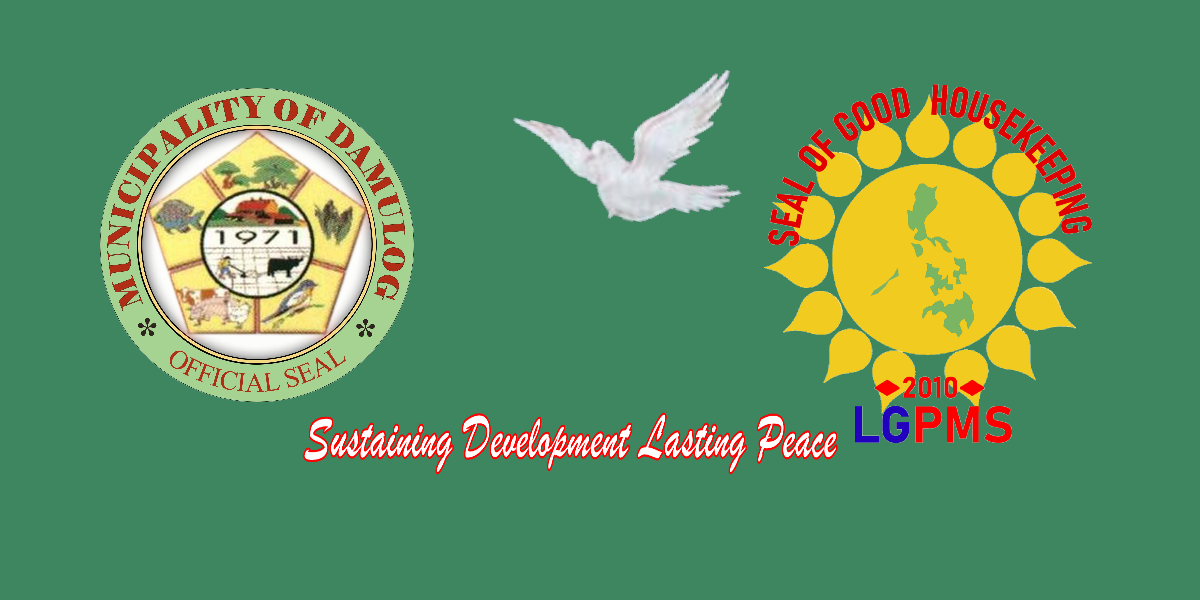
Damulog

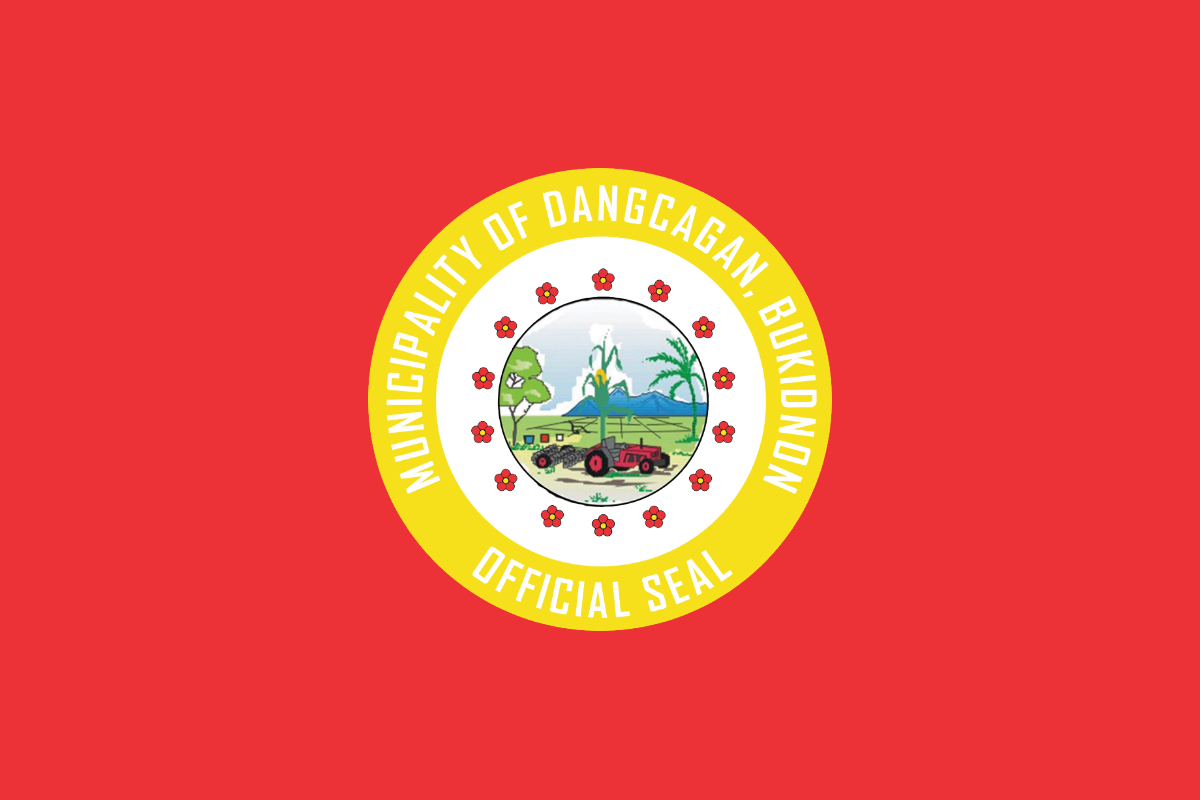
Dangcagan

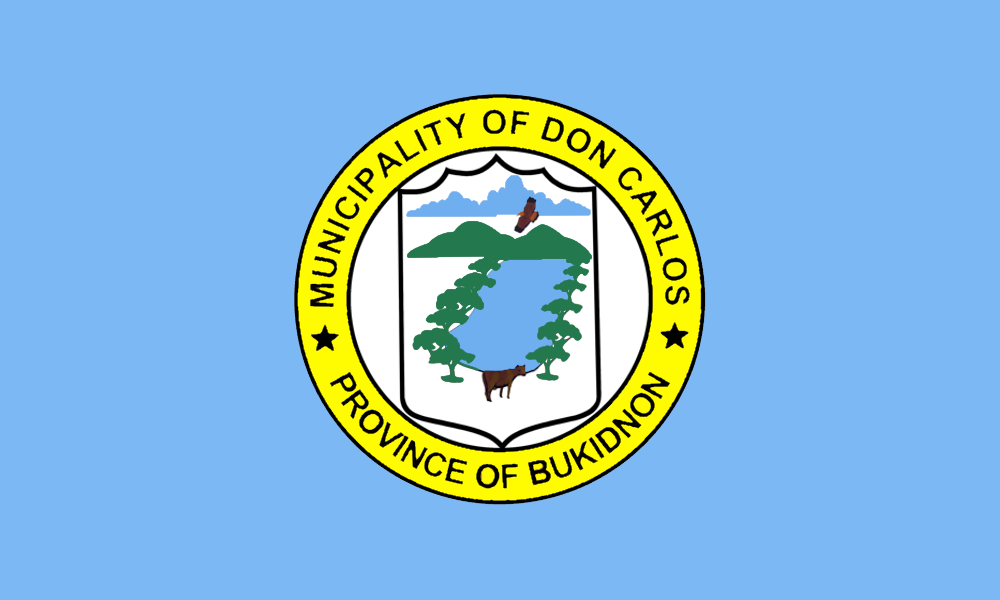
Don Carlos

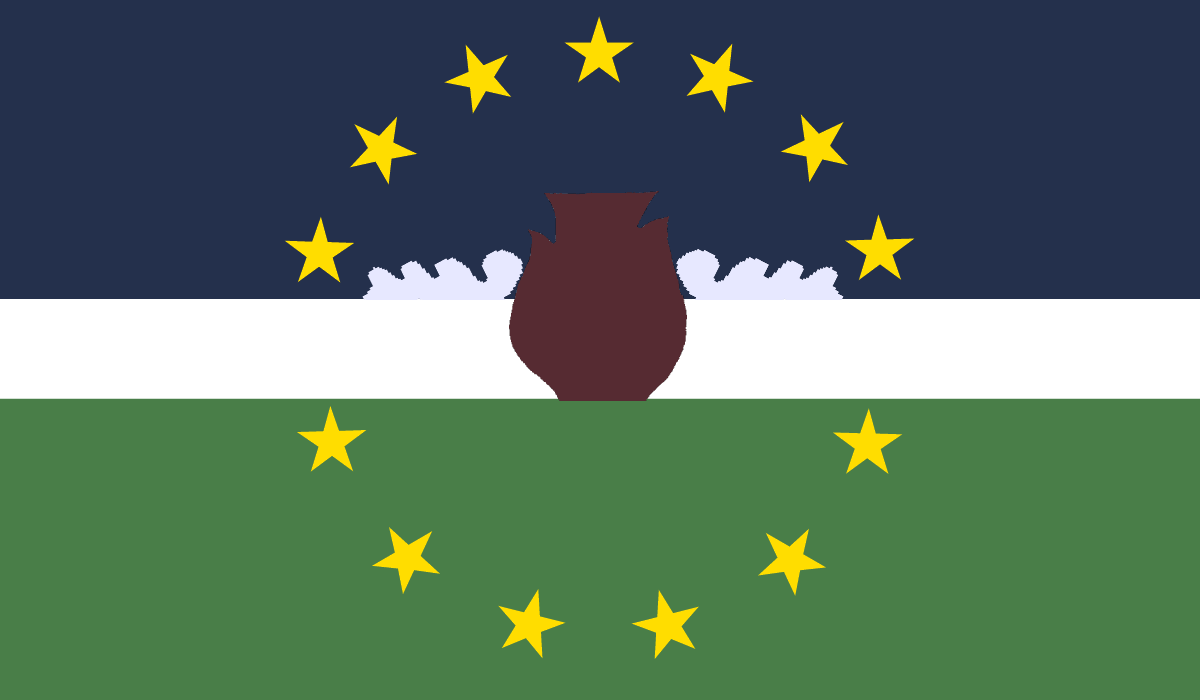
Impasugong

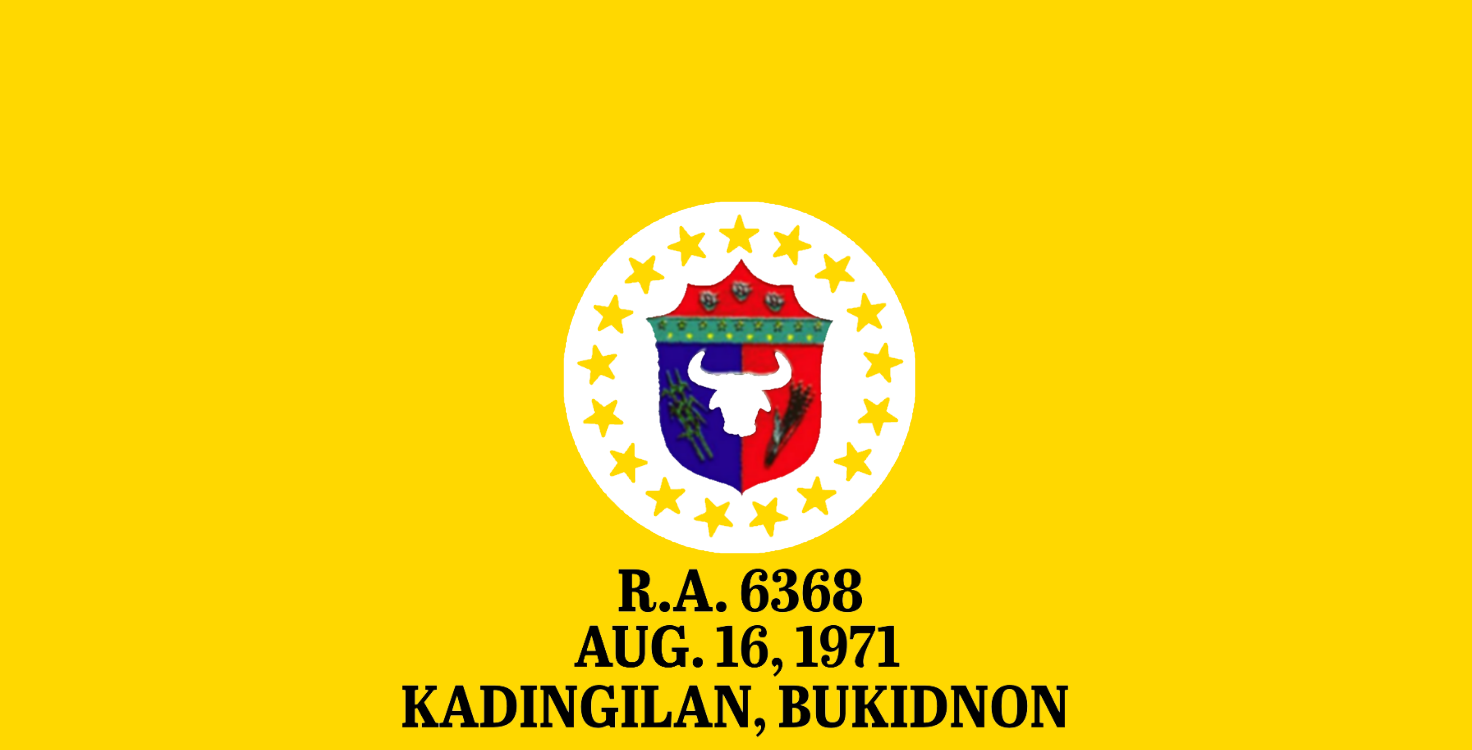
Kadingilan

Kalilangan

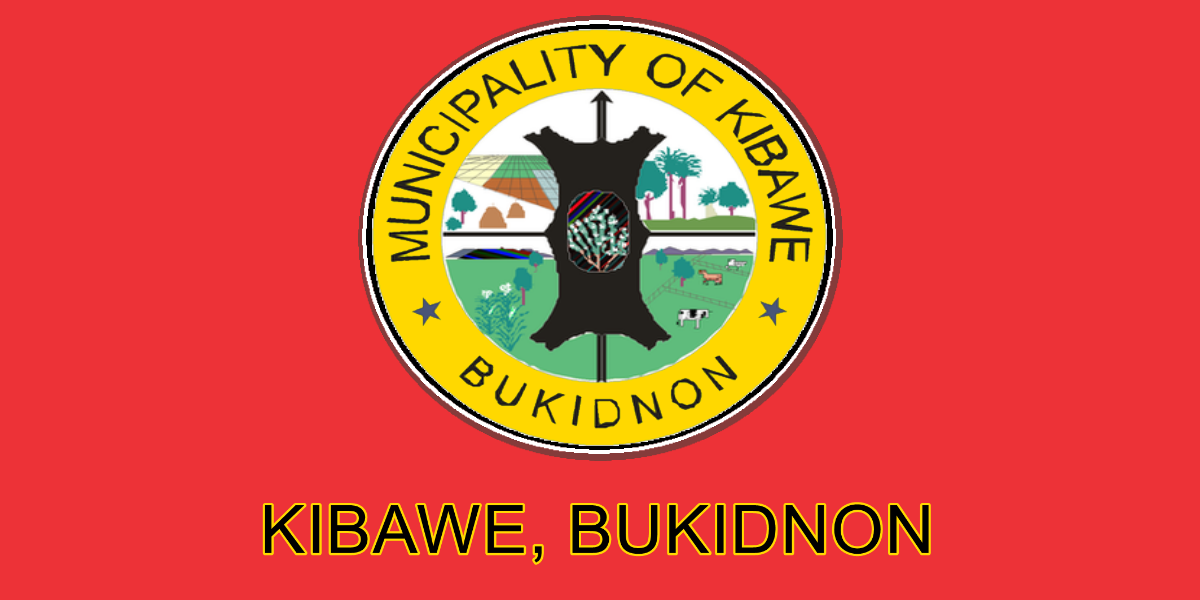
Kibawe

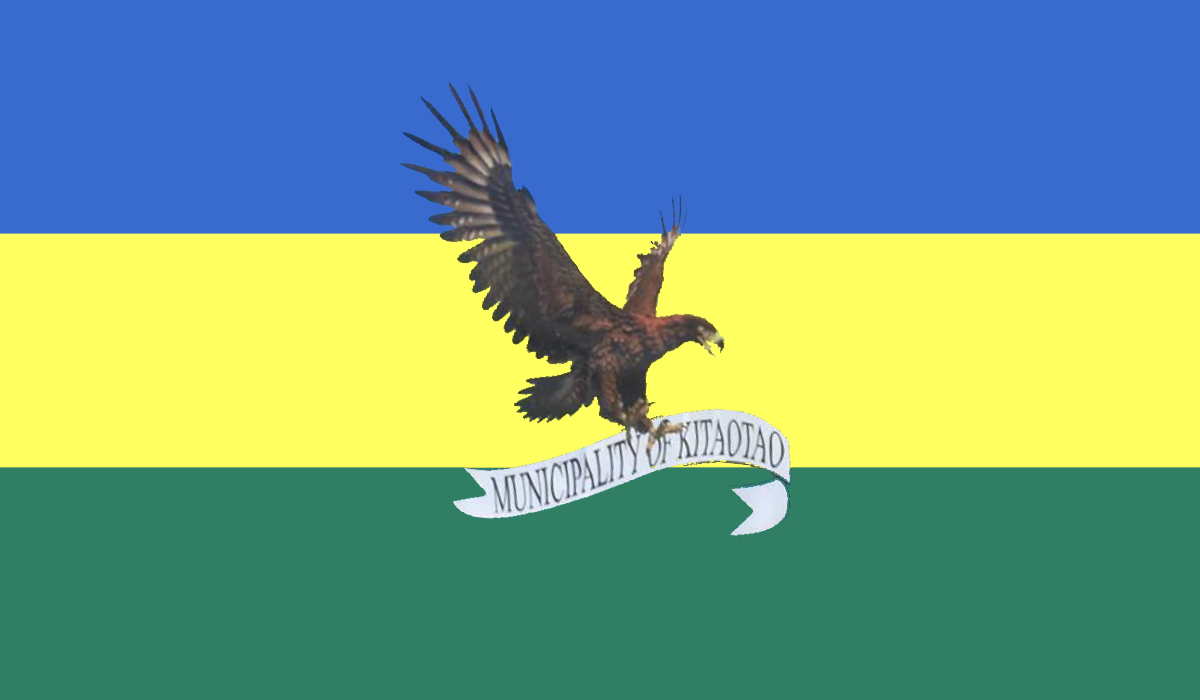
Kitaotao

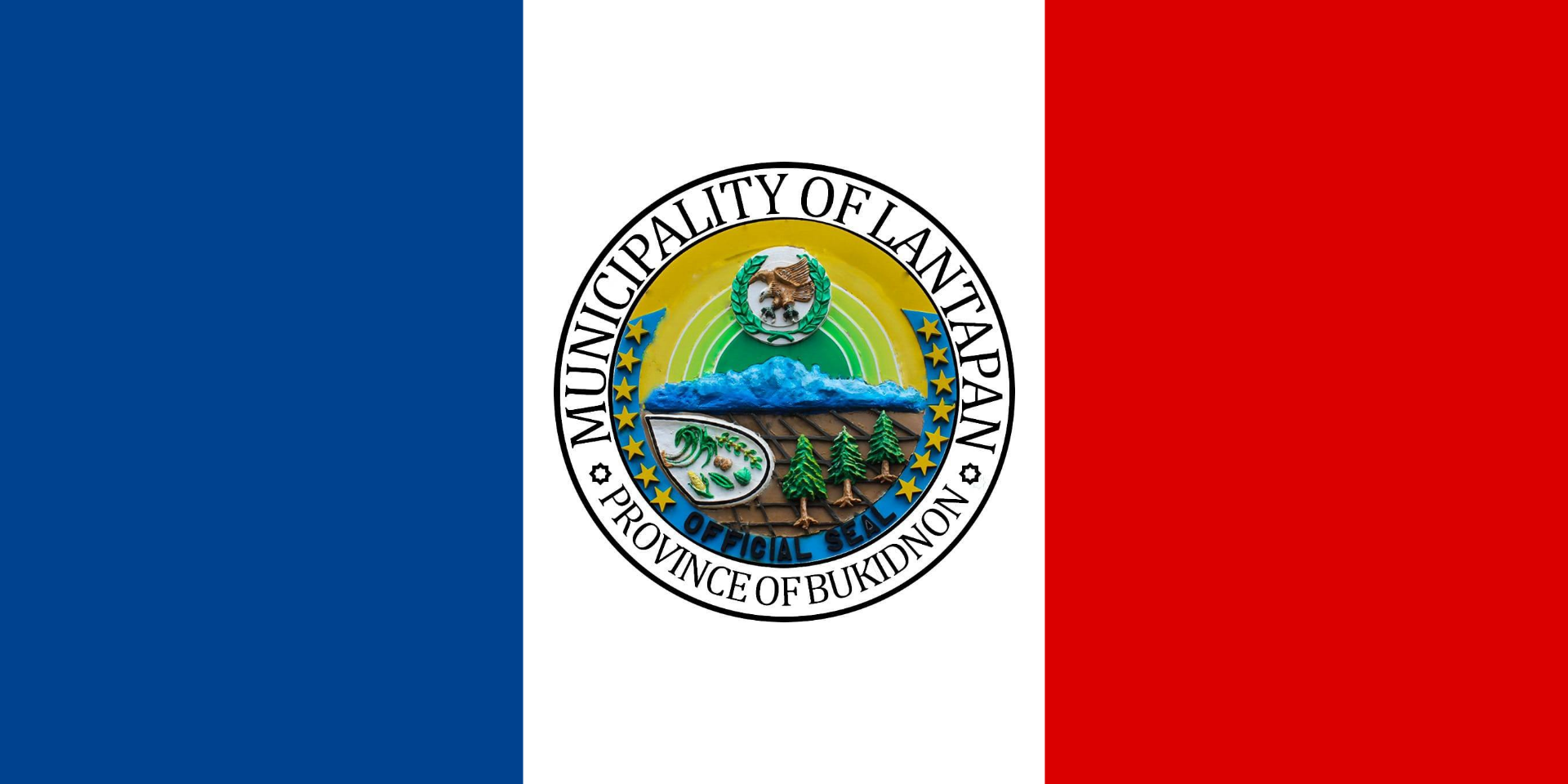
Lantapan

Libona

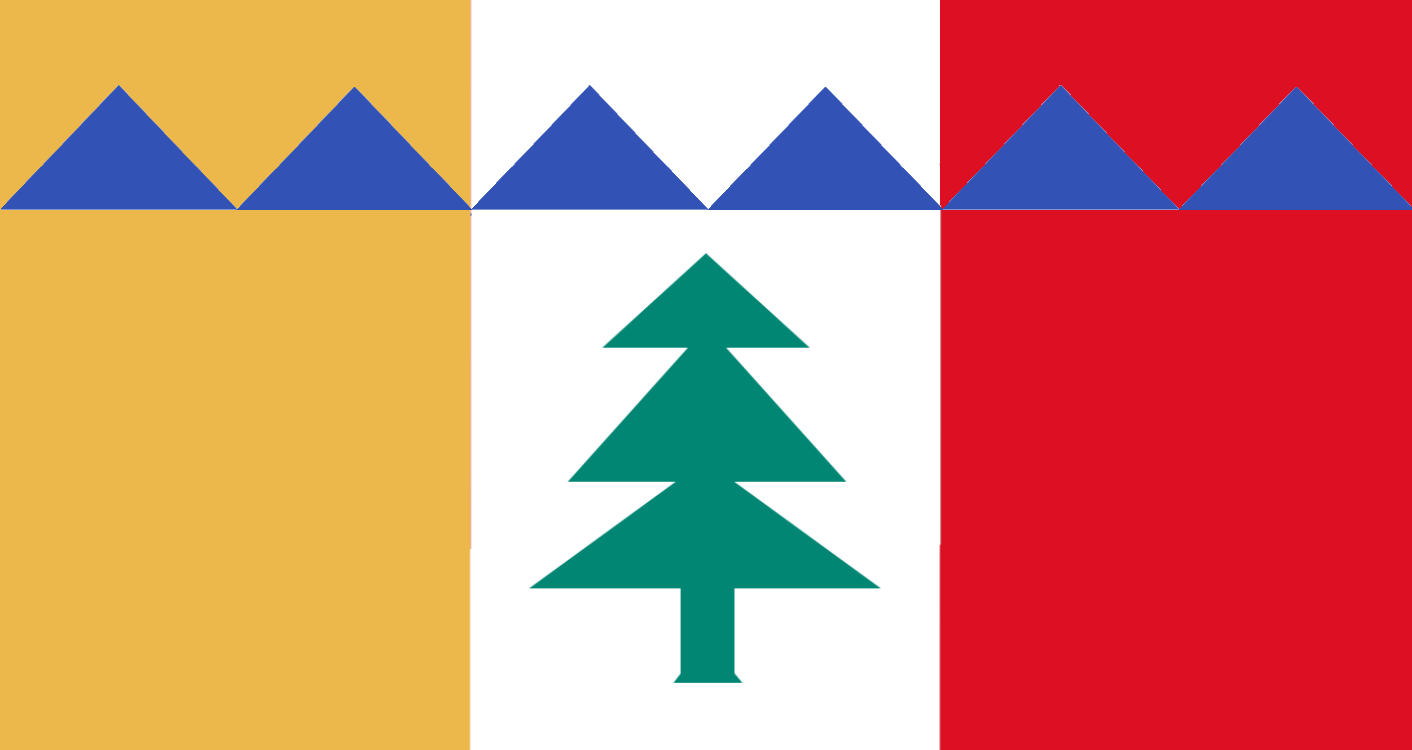
Malaybalay

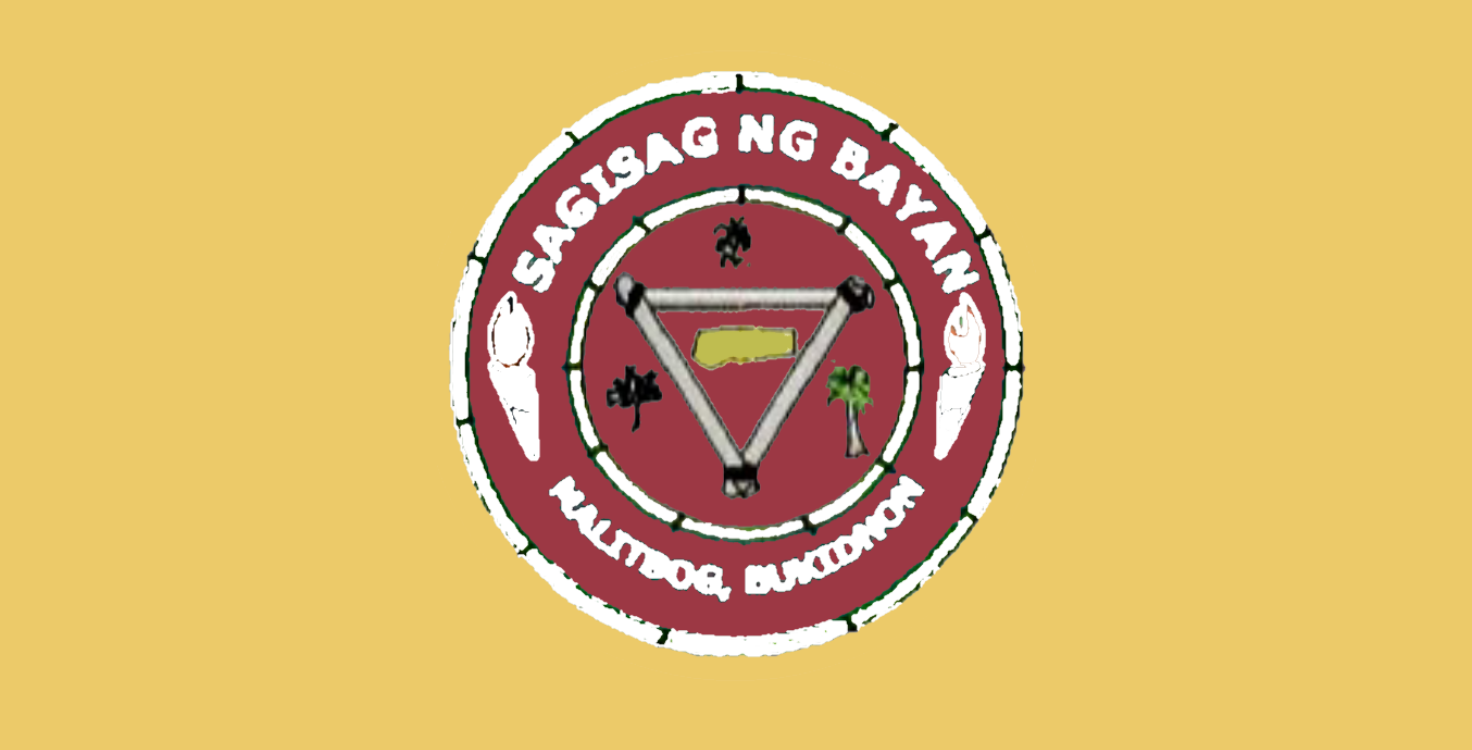
Malitbog

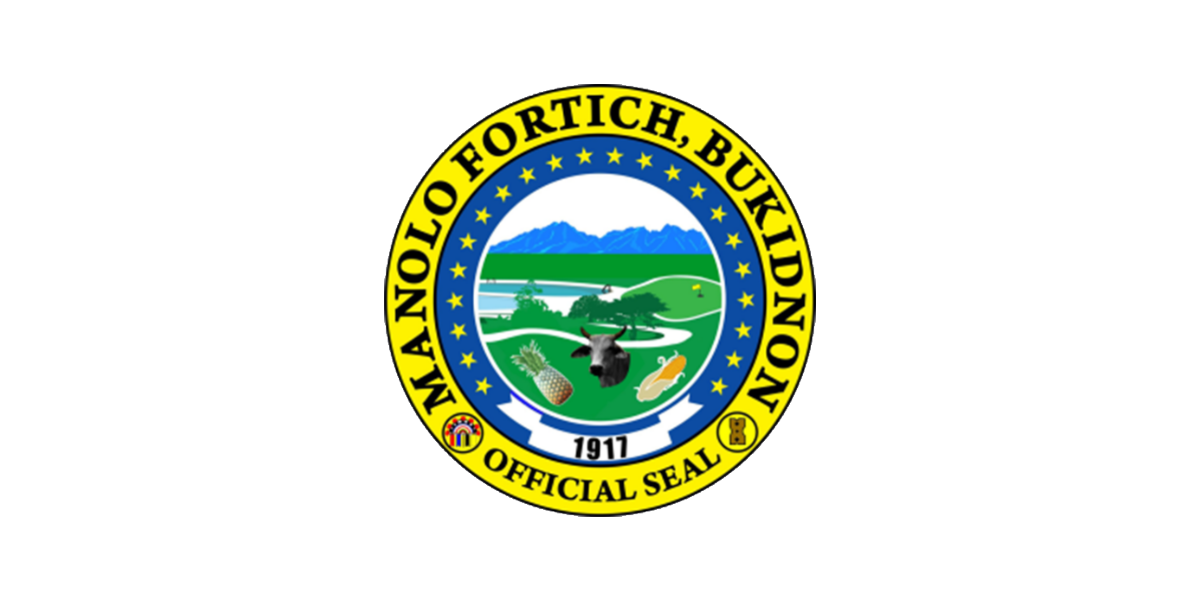
Manolo Fortich

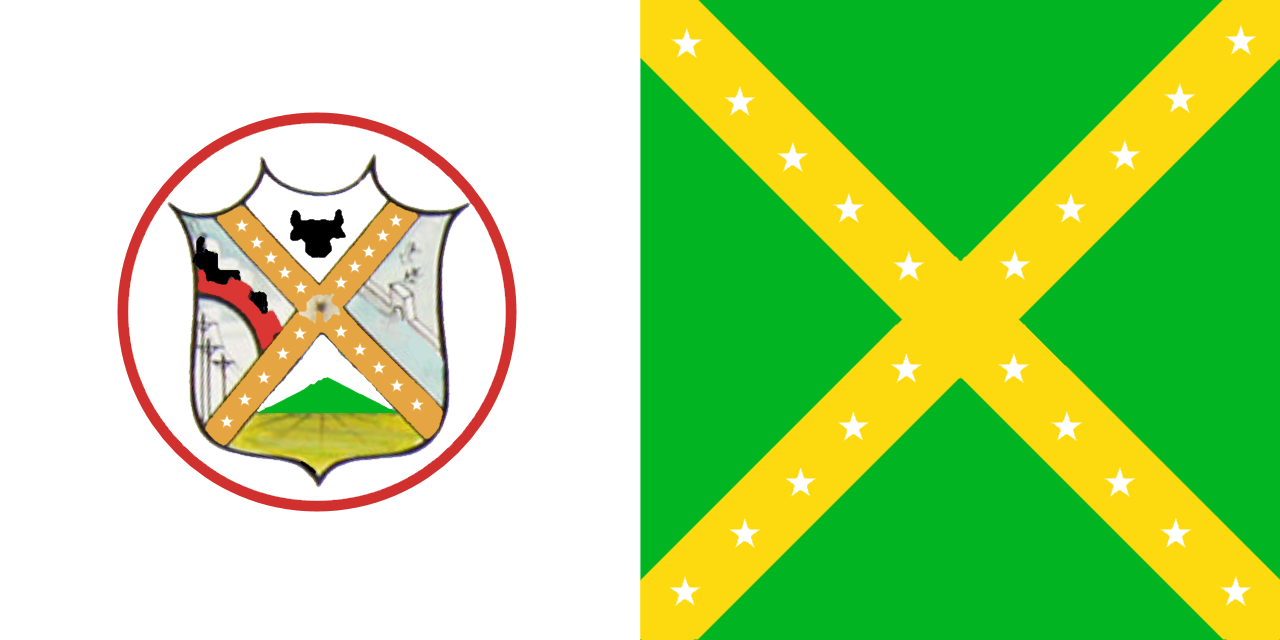
Maramag

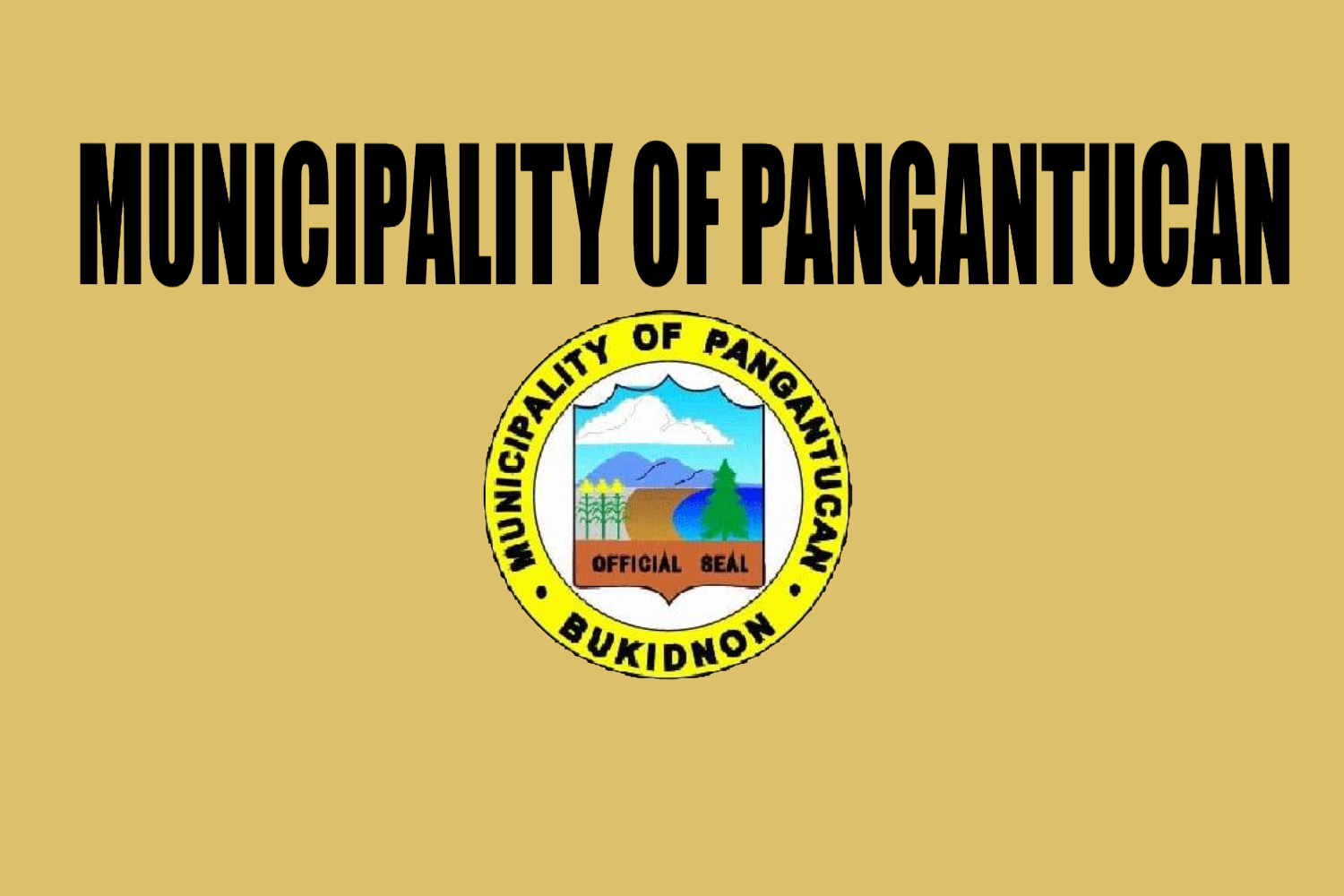
Pangantucan

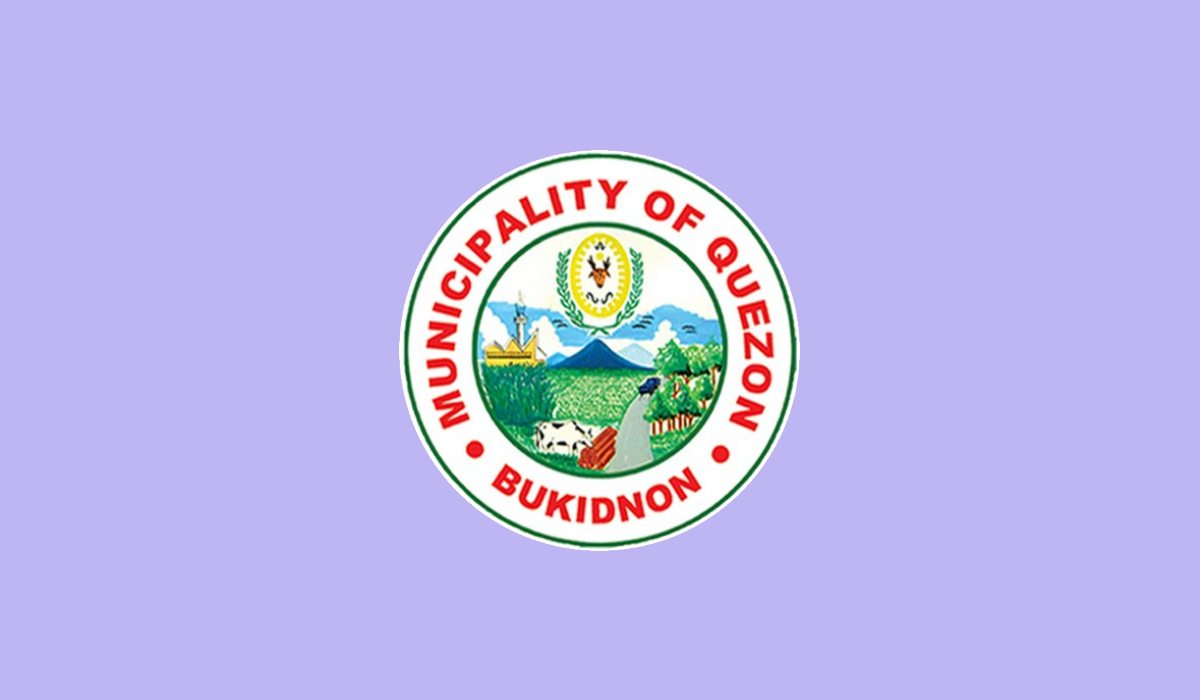
Quezon

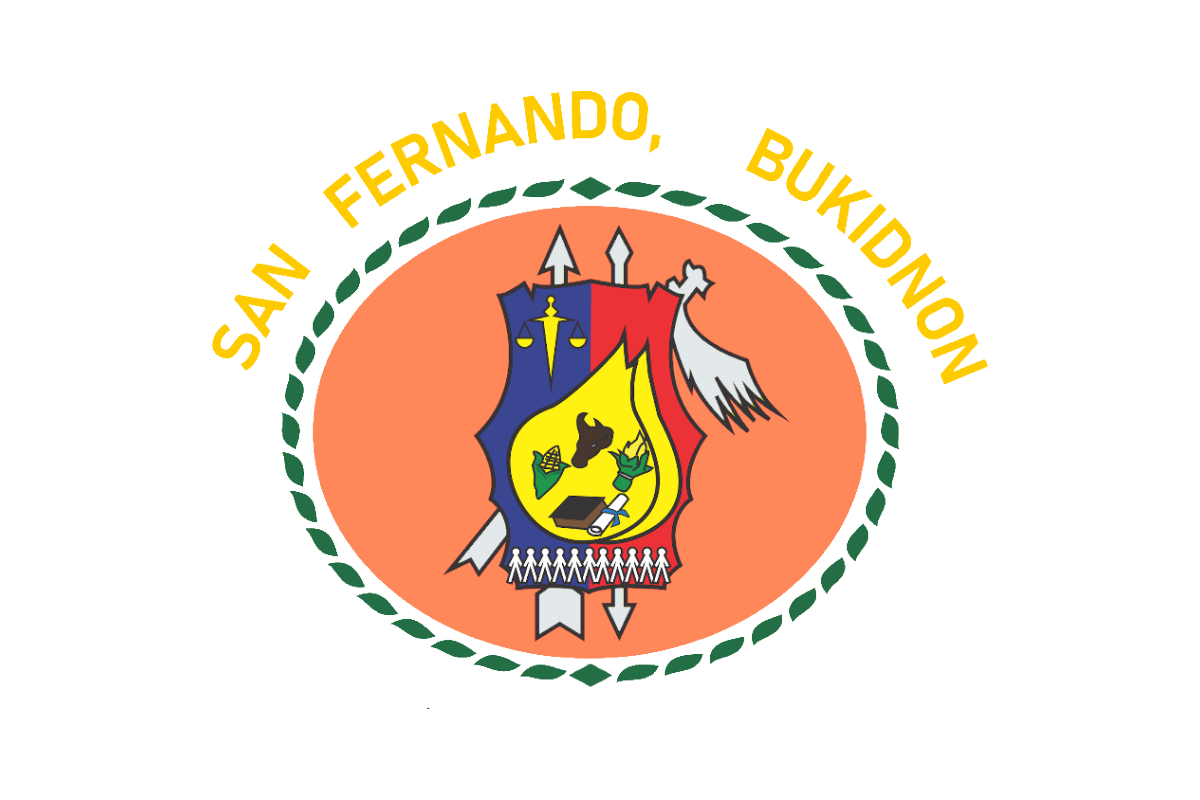
San Fernando

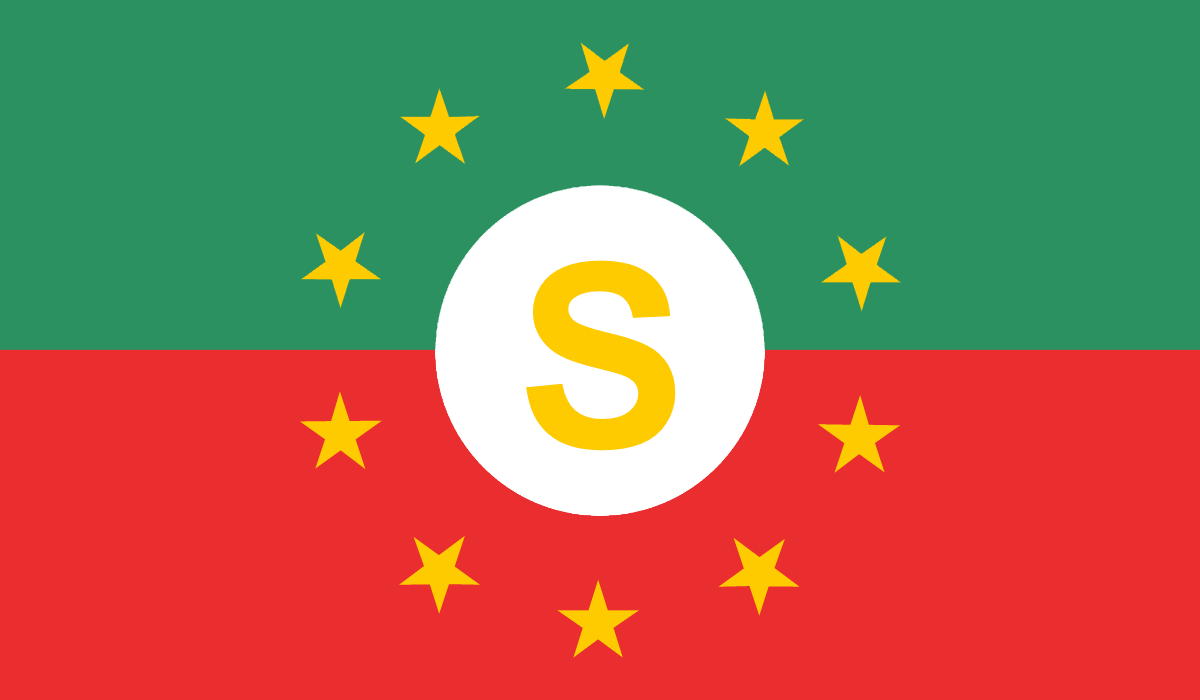
Sumilao

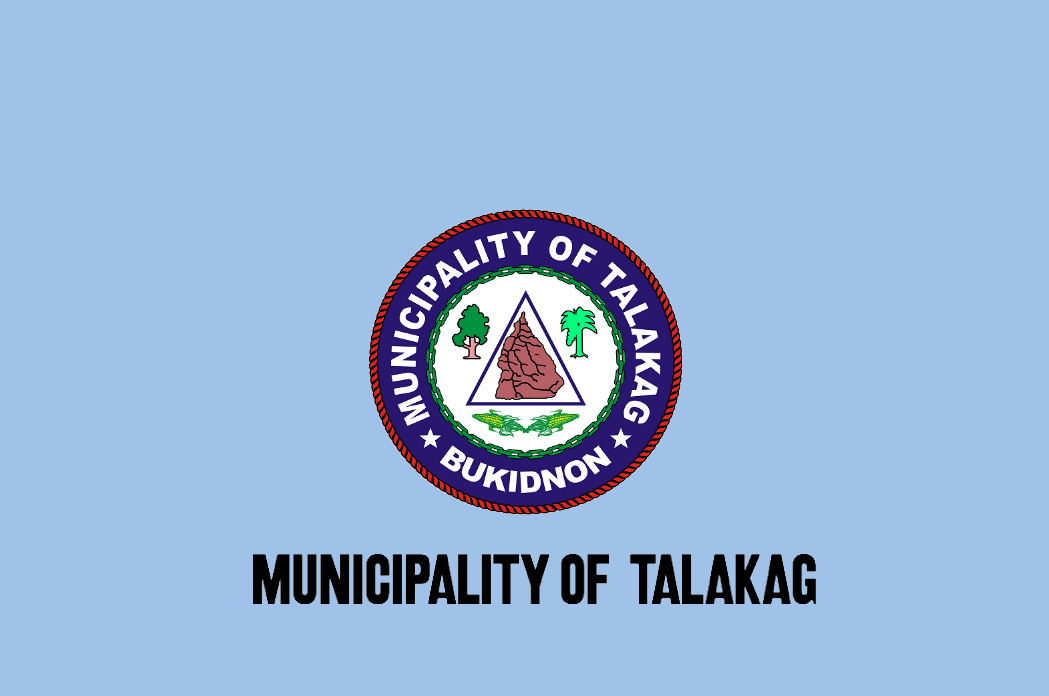
Talakag

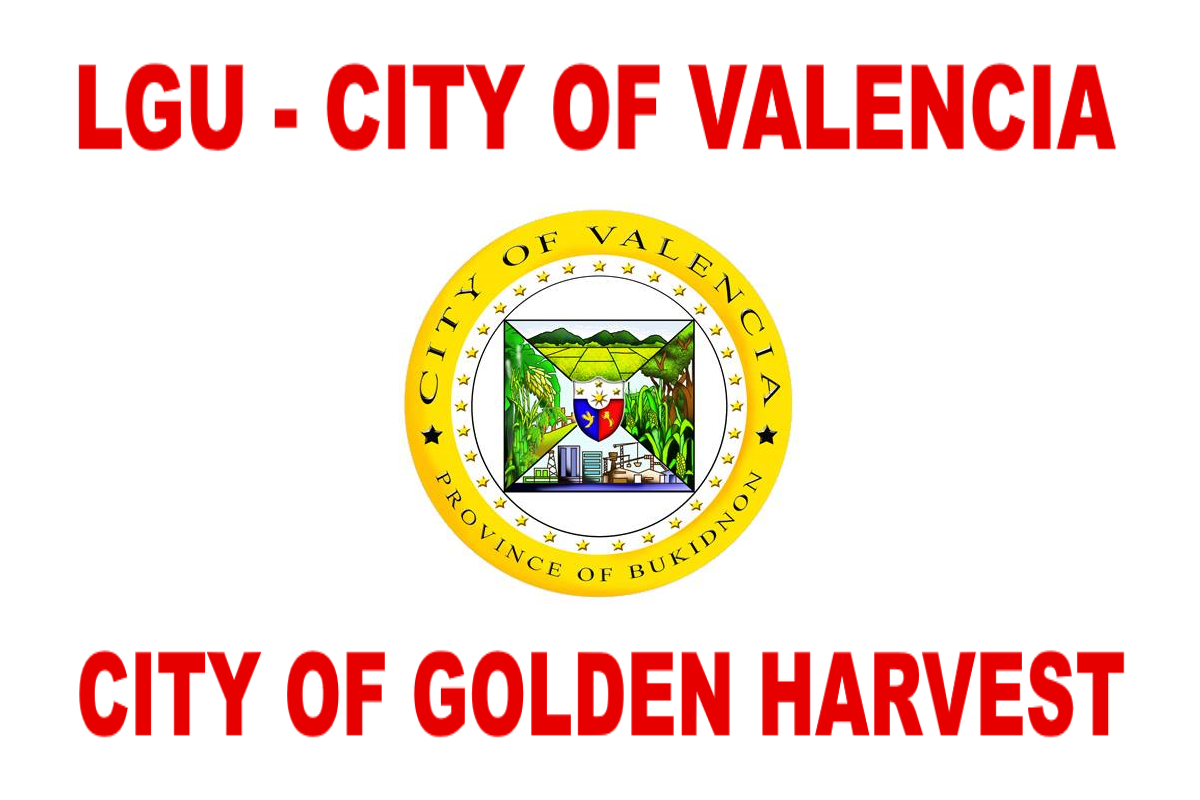
Valencia

== See also ==
- List of flags of the Philippines
- Flags of the Philippine provinces
- Bukidnon
