= Victoria Garchitorena =

Filipino civil society personality

Victoria "Vicky" P. Garchitorena-Arpon is a Filipino civil society personality who has served as a senior government official and a former executive of the Ayala Corporation.

Garchitorena-Arpon headed the Presidential Management Staff in the early years of President Gloria Macapagal Arroyo. She now is a ranking stalwart of the Liberal Party of the Philippines as vice president for women.
