= Mendiola Street =

Thoroughfare in Manila

Coordinates: 14°35′55″N 120°59′30″E

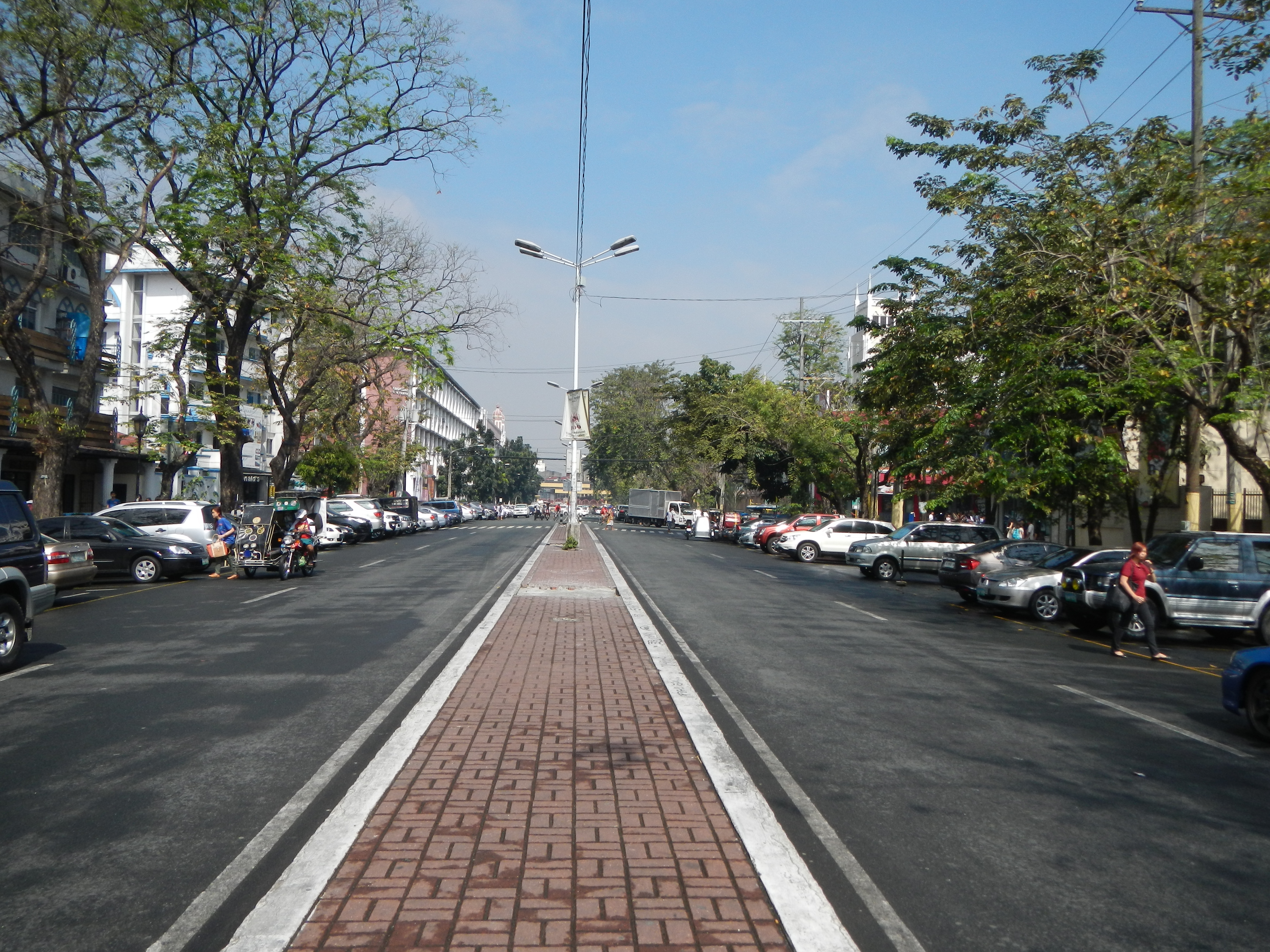
- Mendiola Street near La Consolacion College Manila
- Interactive map of Mendiola Street
- Namesake: Enrique Mendiola
- Maintained by: Department of Public Works and Highways – North Manila District Engineering Office
- Length: 0.578 km (0.359 mi)
- Location: Manila
- From: N180 (Legarda Street) / N145 (Recto Avenue) in Sampaloc & Quiapo
- To: Jose Laurel Street in San Miguel

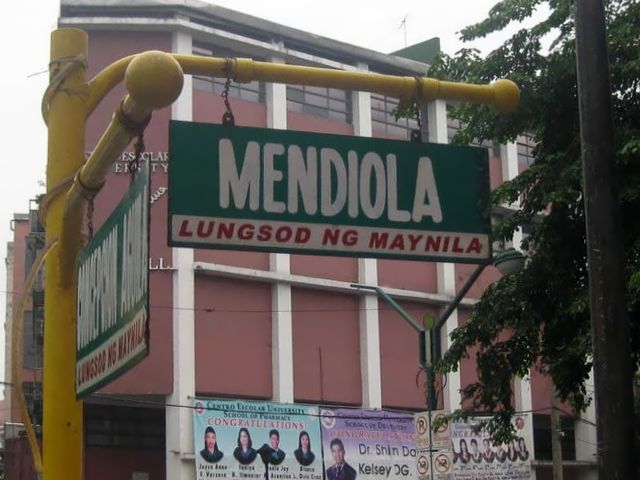
A street sign at the north side of Mendiola corner Concepcion Aguila Streets

Mendiola Street (or simply "Mendiola") is a short thoroughfare in Manila, Philippines. The street is named after Enrique Mendiola, the pedagogue, author of textbooks, educator and member of the first Board of Regents of the University of the Philippines. As a street leading to Malacañan Palace, the President of the Philippines' official residence, it has been a convergence area of numerous and sometimes bloody demonstrations.

On the north end of the street is the Don Chino Roces Bridge, named in honor of Chino Roces, a well-known figure during the Philippines' Martial Law years. (An illuminated street sign above the intersection of Recto and Mendiola erroneously refers to the latter street as Chino Roces Avenue).

Mendiola Street starts at the intersection of Legarda Street and Claro M. Recto Avenue and ends at Jose Laurel Street, just outside Malacañan Palace. Four colleges and universities forming part of the University Belt are on Mendiola Street.

To protect Malacañan Palace, the part of Mendiola Street that starts at the sentinel gate in front of the College of the Holy Spirit and La Consolacion College Manila is closed to vehicles. Vehicles are diverted to Concepcion Aguila Street, a narrow side street that passes through residential areas of San Miguel district.

In addition, Mendiola Street is extended southward from the street's main segment across the Pasig River as Mendiola Extension, running linearly through Malacañang Park and as a short street in Paco. This is a result of the street being initially planned to run further south up to Pandacan but was only partially realized.

== Protests ==
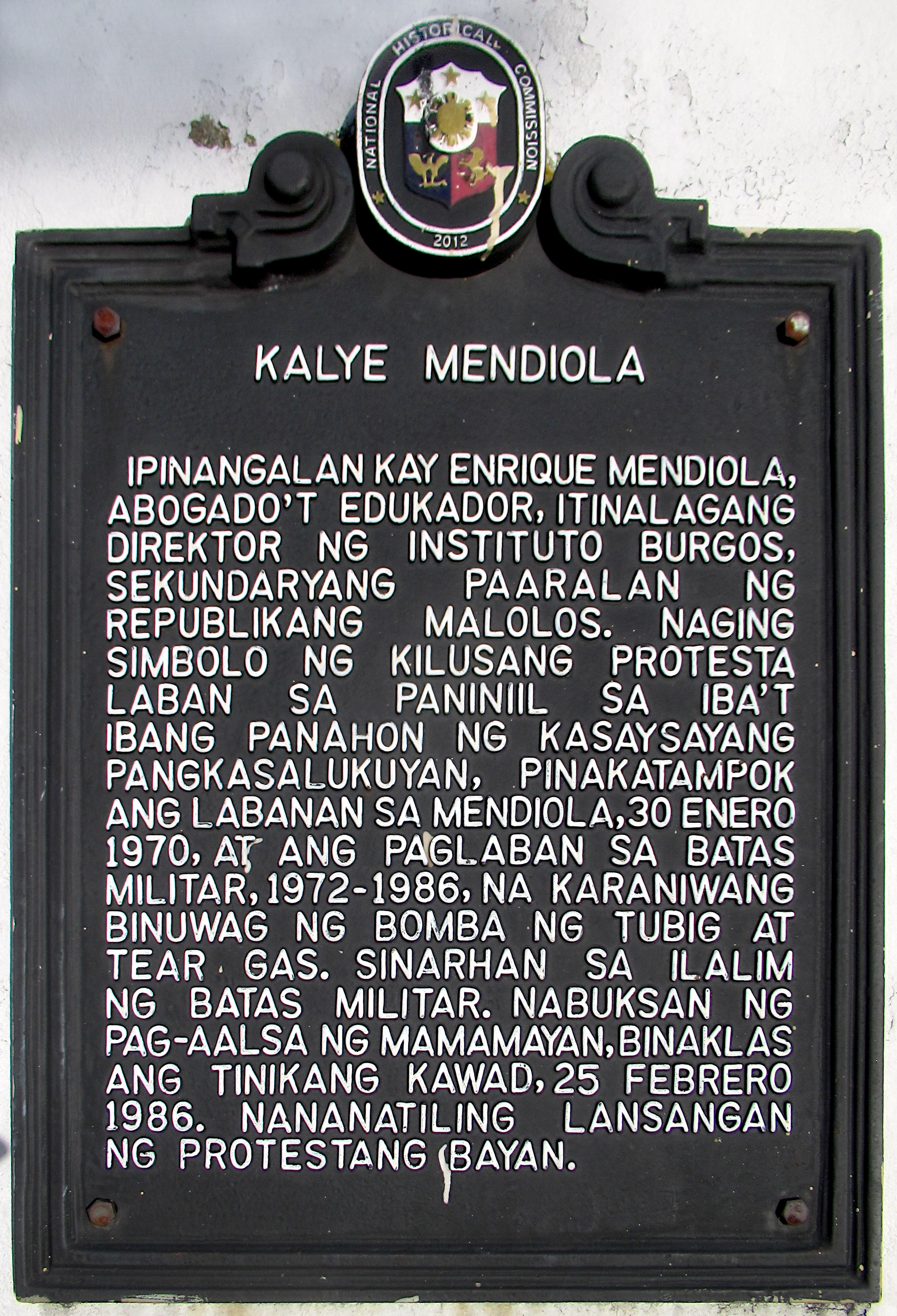
Historical marker installed to commemorate the street and its history

Mendiola Peace Arch

Mendiola Street has been the site of often violent confrontations between protesters and government troops protecting Malacañan Palace:

=== 1970 ===
During the administration of Ferdinand Marcos, Mendiola Street was the site of the "Battle of Malacañang" or "The Battle of Mendiola Bridge", a confrontation between student demonstrators and police forces that occurred during the First Quarter Storm on January 30, 1970. The confrontation resulted in the deaths of four student demonstrators and two bystanders.

=== 1983 ===
On September 21, 1983, breakaway protesters from the "National Day of Sorrow" rally, organized to commemorate the 11th anniversary of the declaration of martial law and condemn the assassination of Ninoy Aquino, which occurred on August 21, went to Mendiola Street, where marines and firemen were stationed, initiating a standoff that resulted in the deaths of 11 people, seven of whom were protesters.

=== 1987 ===
On January 22, 1987, crowd control troops opened fire on a protest rally of about 10,000 peasant farmers demanding "genuine" land reform from then-President Corazon Aquino. Thirteen of the protesters were killed, and hundreds were injured in the incident now known as the Mendiola massacre.

=== 2001 ===
On May 1, 2001, supporters of former President Joseph Estrada, angered by his arrest following his ouster from power earlier that year, marched to Mendiola Street after staging demonstrations outside the EDSA Shrine. They demanded the release and reinstatement of Estrada. A violent confrontation ensued between Estrada's supporters and members of the Philippine National Police and the Armed Forces of the Philippines, who were then tasked by the then-President, Gloria Macapagal Arroyo, to secure Malacañan Palace and the areas surrounding it. Mendiola Street and the vicinity around Malacañan Palace became a front line after the protesters tried to storm the Palace. Casualties were high on both the Estrada supporters' and government troops' end. As a result of the looting of stores and shops and the burning of several government and private vehicles by the protesters, damage to and loss of property along Mendiola Street and areas within the vicinity of Malacañan Palace was estimated to be millions of pesos. President Gloria Macapagal Arroyo declared a state of rebellion to stifle the rioting; it was lifted after two days.

=== 2025 ===
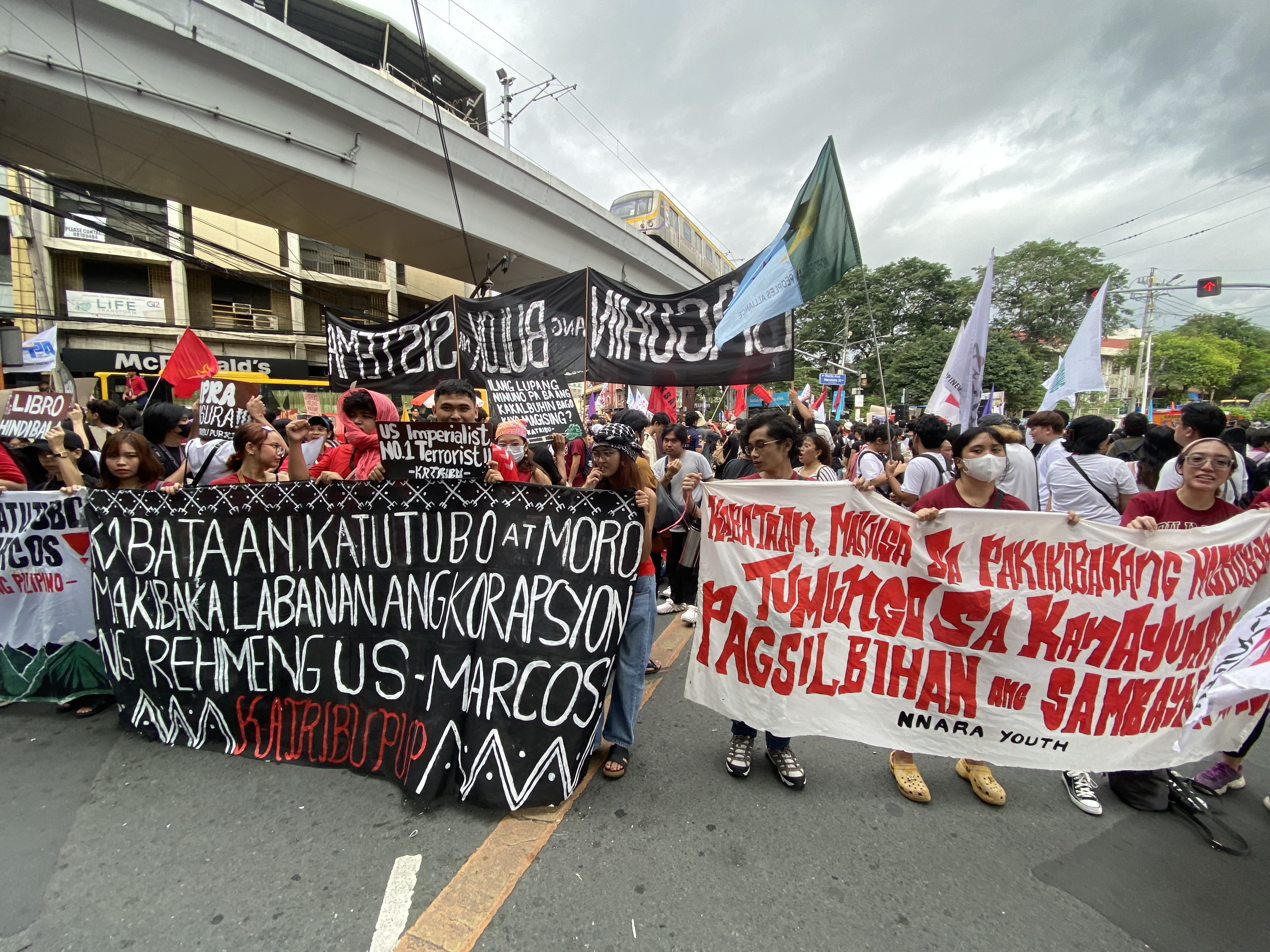
More than 5,000 youth participated in an October 17 anti-corruption protest at Mendiola led by Anakbayan and other groups. The mobilization called for the removal of both President Marcos Jr. and Vice President Duterte.

On September 21, 2025, as protests gathered in Luneta Park and EDSA Shrine, a group of unidentified masked rioters clashed with the police on Mendiola Street, throwing stones and bottles, and waving the Philippine flag, anarchy symbols, and the Straw Hat Pirates' Jolly Roger near the Mendiola Peace Arch in an attempt to break through the police line shielding the road to Malacañan Palace amidst the anti-corruption rallies. The police tried to defend the bridge. The rallyists then proceeded to destroy barricades and police defenses, and fires lit up on an excavator in the middle of the street and along the road. As a result of the chaos, authorities then started throwing tear gas, using water cannons, and arrested 17 rioters. There were 48 injured on both the rallyist and police sides, which led to rallyists retreating from Mendiola Street.

Rallies have continued throughout October. On October 3, teachers, led by the Alliance of Concerned Teachers, 'walked-out' against corruption. Meanwhile, on October 17, youth groups such as Anakbayan, UP Act Against Corruption Network, National Union of Students of the Philippines, and Kabataan Partylist launched a 5,000 youth mobilization. Both protests marched to Mendiola.
