= Maxelende Ganade =

Filipino musician, lyricist, and composer (1937–2020)

Maxelende B. Ganade
- Born: Maxelende Bag-ao Ganade; November 24, 1937; Tagbilaran, Bohol, Philippines
- Died: October 11, 2020 (aged 82); Tagbilaran, Bohol, Philippines
- Occupation: Musician
- Years active: 1974–2020

Maxelende Bag-ao Ganade (November 24, 1937 – October 11, 2020) was a Filipino musician, lyricist and composer. She translated the original English lyrics of the "Bohol Hymn" into Binisaya (Awit sa Bohol). The Bohol Hymn is the official anthem of the Province of Bohol, Philippines, which was composed by Justino Romea from Loon town.

== Biography ==
Ganade started playing the piano while in Grade 3 as encouraged by her parents Nicomedes Ganade and Consorcia Bag-ao who are both musicians. She graduated her elementary and high school at Holy Spirit Tagbilaran City. She took Bachelor of Music from the College of the Holy Spirit in Manila and she had rendered performances, helped in musical shows and had written compositions.

Ganade’s repertoire as an orchestral soloist ranges from the classical repertoire of Mozart and Beethoven to the Romantic literature of Brahms, Tchaikovsky, Schumann and Rachmaninoff to the modern works of Debussy, Ravel, Shostakovich, Prokofiev and Bartók.

It was during the administration of then Governor Lino Chatto that the provincial government of Bohol undertook the initiative to formally identify the provincial symbols and seals, including the Bohol flag and hymn.

Justino 'Ning" Romea, a writer of the Bohol Chronicle and composer of the RPC Song (now the UB Hymn) and the Bohol Provincial School of Nursing Hymn, was commissioned to pen the Bohol Provincial Hymn. It was first sung publicly by a female choir of the College of Holy Spirit of Tagbilaran on March 1, 1970 in time for the unfurling of the Bohol Flag during the opening ceremonies of the 1970 East Visayan Athletic Association held in Tagbilaran City.

On September 24, 1970, the Provincial Board passed Resolution No. 215 adopting it as the official song of the province of Bohol.

As the hymn's original version was in English, the Provincial Board, a few years after, endeavored to have it translated into the vernacular. It must be cited, however, that Justino Romea would have wanted to translate his original composition had the Board informed him. This intent of his can be read in "Bohol Without Tears" a three-volume book written and published by Simplicio M. Apalisok. Meanwhile, the competition was launched and the entry of Maxelende Ganade emerged as the best and was adjudged the winner. With some modifications by the Board of Judges in consultation with authorities in music Mrs. Enriquita Borja-Butalid and Mrs. Maria Fe Rocha-Lumayag, then Division Supervisor and music consultant, the Boholano version was adopted by the Provincial Board in Resolution No. 151 dated September 13, 1974.

While the lyrics and music of the Bohol Hymn (English version) is credited to Romea, the Awit sa Bohol (Boholano version) is largely attributed to Ganade.

Ganade also composed the Carmen hymn and other hymns in school and special affairs. Her arrangement of Pobreng Alindahaw is included in the Loboc Children's Choir and the almub: A Child's Heart Sings.

Ganade taught piano lessons at the Holy Spirit School in Tagbilaran City. She played the province's old pipe organs and marimba during cultural affairs.

She died on October 11, 2020.

== Sources ==
- http://www.bohol.ph/article35.html
- The Bohol Chronicle, August 3, 2008
- http://www.bohol-island.com/about/hymn.htm
- https://web.archive.org/web/20090918054050/http://ling.lll.hawaii.edu/~uhdoc/eskaya/Translation%202.html
