= Justino Romea =

Justino "Tining" Romea (J. Ning Romea)
- Born: Justino Relampagos Romea; September 26, 1924; Napo, Loon, Bohol, Philippine Islands
- Died: 1985 (aged 50–51); Bohol, Philippines
- Occupations: Musician, Columnist
- Years active: 1953–1985

Justino 'Tining' R. Romea (Napo, Loon, September 26, 1924– 1985) was a Filipino composer, playwright, director, musical arranger, poet, and journalist. He composed the Bohol Hymn — later translated to “Awit sa Bohol” which became the official hymn of the Province of Bohol, Philippines. He also composed “Dalaga sa Baybayon” (“Maiden of the Shore”) — one of the many theme songs he wrote for his stage plays — and the beloved love song “Ako Kang Paabuton” (literally translated as “I’ll Be Waiting for You” a.k.a. “Buhi sa Kanunay”) which he dedicated to his wife Jesusa Dalugdug Romea with whom he had eight children. J. Ning Romea composed the University of Bohol Hymn (UB Hymn) commissioned by the Tirol family. His Bohol Chronicle Sunday columns marked by deep, sensitive — at times good-humored — observation of Filipino culture, were a mainstay for many years.

== Biography ==
Born in 1924 to Bernardo Vidal Romea, a composer and playwright, and Francisca Posas Relampagos, in Napo, Loon, Bohol, and later settled in Maribojoc with his wife Jesusa Dalugdug (also from Napo) and family when they were able to acquire a property closer to his work as a teacher and Supply Officer at the Bohol School of Arts and Trades (BSAT) — later called CVSCAFT, presently the Bohol Island State University — until his retirement.

Romea was commissioned to compose the Bohol Provincial Hymn. It was first performed publicly by an all-female choir of the College of Holy Spirit of Tagbilaran City on March 1, 1970 at the first unfurling of the Bohol Flag during the opening ceremonies of the 1970 East Visayas Athletic Association in Tagbilaran City.

On September 24, 1970, the Provincial Board passed Resolution No. 215 adopting it as the official hymn of the province of Bohol. As the hymn's original version was in English, the Provincial Board, a few years after decided to translate the hymn into Boholano. A contest was launched where the entry of Maxelende Ganade was the winner. The Boholano version adopted by the Provincial Board in Resolution No. 151 dated September 13, 1974 follows the singing of the Philippine National Anthem at every public occasion and ceremony ever since.

Romea also composed many other love song, theme songs, and school anthems like University of Bohol or UB Hymn, BSAT Hymn, Saint Joseph Institute of Technology in Butuan, and he is best remembered for the love song "Ako Kang Paabuton," (also known as “Buhi sa Kanunay”) and the song "Dalaga sa Baybayon". He also composed many of the theme songs and music for the annual 'dramas” or stage plays in his native Napo for which he served as writer, director and musical composer.

Manong Tining was also a “revered” columnist of Bohol Chronicle. After his death, his columns were reprinted. His weekly columns were in the frontpage of the Bohol Chronicle defying editing rules and newspaper protocol. He was an adviser to a previous mayor of Maribojoc.

== Honors ==
- Singer Bayang Barrios published a popular interpretation of Romea’s song "Ako Kang Paabuton” a. k. a. “Buhi sa Kanunay.” The Governor’s Award, honored by the University of Bohol

== Sources ==
- http://www.bohol-island.com/about/hymn.htm
- http://www.bohol.ph/article35.html
- http://www.boholchronicle.com
- http://loon.gov.ph/index.php?option=com_content&task=view&id=112&Itemid=1
