= Flag of Bohol =

Bohol
- Use: State flag
- Proportion: 1:2
- Adopted: 28 October 1969 (original); 1971 (current)
- Design: Canadian Pale, with the seal of Bohol.

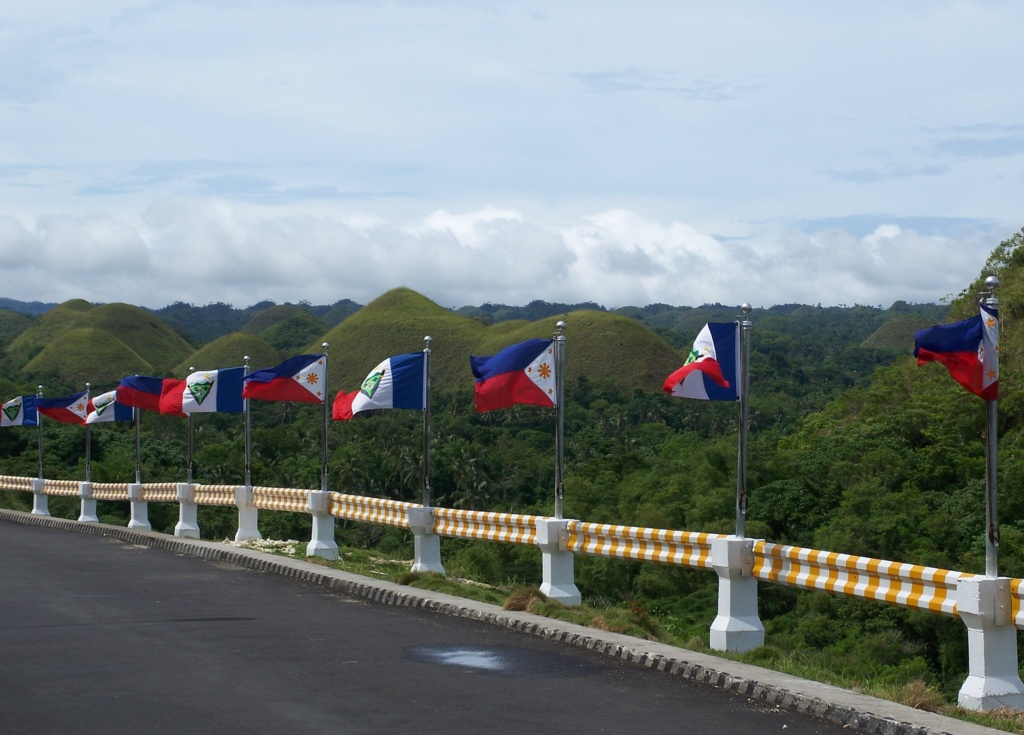
Flags of Bohol and the Philippines near the Chocolate Hills. The color of the star used in the flags is plain yellow, instead of the yellow-fimbriated blue star as dictated by law. The shade of blue used in this version is the same as that of the current shade of blue (royal blue) in the Philippine flag, which was only made official in 1998. However, when the specifications for the Bohol flag were described in 1969 the shade of blue of the Philippine flag was navy blue; most official versions of the Bohol flag use navy blue.

The Flag of Bohol is the provincial flag of Bohol, Philippines. It is a vertical triband bearing the three main colors of the Philippine flag. According to the official interpretation of the flag's symbolism, the color blue represents nobility; white, purity; and red, courage. The design is similar to the flags of France and the Novgorod Oblast in Russia.

Bohol is one of the few Philippine provinces to have a distinctly-designed flag, deviating from the standard flag design of the provincial seal on a colored field. The flag has a proportion of 1:2, the same as the flag of the Philippines.

== Symbolism ==
Charged on the white field is the main portion of the seal of Bohol, depicting the island's history and famous landmarks: on the foreground is a tableau of the Sandugo between Miguel López de Legazpi and Datu Sikatuna which symbolizes the "Boholano's love of peace," while behind this are the Chocolate Hills and a field of green, symbolizing the province's natural beauty and agricultural resources. Flanking this scene are the two barongs (swords) representing the Tamblot uprising and the Dagohoy rebellion, whose tips meet at the bottom of the emblem.

A blue five-pointed star, fimbriated yellow, appears above the central emblem; on all physical versions of the flag the star always appears on the observer's right, whether on the obverse or reverse side. The lone star represents Carlos P. Garcia, the only president of the Philippines to come from Bohol: his tenure as Philippine president (1957–1961) was originally represented by a yellow star on the original provincial flag; a smaller blue star "superimposed" on the yellow star was added in 1971 after Garcia was elected president of the 1971 Constitutional Convention, even though he died the day after he took his oath. Another star is meant to be added for every Boholano that becomes president of the Philippines.

== History ==
The flag was adopted as the provincial flag through Provincial Board Resolution No. 238 on 28 October 1969. The current version of the flag, with a blue star "superimposed" on the yellow star, became official with the adoption of Provincial Board Resolution No. 121 in 1971.

== See also ==
- Bohol
- Flags of the provinces of the Philippines
