= C9orf152 =

Protein-coding gene in the species Homo sapiens

Identifiers
- Aliases: C9orf152, bA470J20.2, chromosome 9 open reading frame 152
- External IDs: MGI: 2442889; HomoloGene: 52276; GeneCards: C9orf152; OMA:C9orf152 - orthologs

Gene location (Human)
Chr.	Chromosome 9 (human)
Band	9q31.3	Start	110,190,048 bp
Band	9q31.3	End	110,208,159 bp

Gene location (Mouse)
Chr.	Chromosome 4 (mouse)
Band	4|4 B3	Start	57,908,483 bp
Band	4|4 B3	End	57,916,297 bp
RNA expression pattern
Bgee	Human / Mouse (ortholog); Top expressed in: mucosa of ileum; mucosa of sigmoid colon; rectum; mucosa of transverse colon; pylorus; bronchial epithelial cell; pancreatic epithelial cell; jejunal mucosa; cardia; lower lobe of lung / Top expressed in: Paneth cell; left colon; vestibular membrane of cochlear duct; otolith organ; utricle; lacrimal gland; prostate; lobe of prostate; submandibular gland; parotid gland; More reference expression data
BioGPS	n/a
Orthologs
Species	Human	Mouse
Entrez	401546	242484
Ensembl	ENSG00000188959	ENSMUSG00000052117
UniProt	Q5JTZ5	Q8K0M7
RefSeq (mRNA)	NM_001012993	NM_178727
RefSeq (protein)	NP_001013011; NP_001013011.2	NP_848842
Location (UCSC)	Chr 9: 110.19 – 110.21 Mb	Chr 4: 57.91 – 57.92 Mb
PubMed search
- Wikidata
View/Edit Human	View/Edit Mouse

Chromosome 9 open reading frame 152 is a protein that in humans is encoded by the C9orf152 gene. The exact function of the protein is not completely understood.

== Gene ==
The human gene C9orf152 is located on the long (q) arm of Chromosome 9. Its cytogenetic location is 9q31.1. It has one known alias: bA470J20.2.

The DNA sequence encoding C9orf152 contains a single intron. The final mRNA consists of 2698 base pairs. Nucleotides 66-68 encode an upstream in frame stop codon.

The exact location of C9orf152 alongside the closest genetic neighbors.

== Evolution ==
C9orf152 has orthologs in mammals, birds, reptiles and amphibians. No orthologs have been detected in bony fish or in any invertebrates. The following table lists a subset of conserved orthologs.

Scientific name	Common name	Accession number	Sequence length (aa)	Percent identity	Percent similarity
Homo sapiens	Human	NP_001013011.2	239	-	-
Pan troglodytes	Chimpanzee	XP_001145187	239	98	98
Tarsius syrichta	Philippine tarsier	XP_008064367	237	78	85
Ceratotherium simum simum	Rhinoceros	XP_004423784	239	78	82
Sus scrofa	Wild boar	XP_003122117	239	74	83
Equus caballus	Horse	XP_001491697	239	74	80
Tursiops truncatus	Bottlenose dolphin	XP_004329084	234	73	81
Heterocephalus glaber	Naked mole rat	XP_004903816	239	74	84
Orcinus orca	Killer whale	XP_004269444	231	72	79
Mus musculus	Mouse	NP_848842	236	62	72
Rattus norvegicus	Rat	XP_003754080	234	62	70
Chelonia mydas	Green sea turtle	XP_007059491	267	33	49
Nestor notabilis	Kea	XP_010009525	265	34	49
Python bivittatus	Burmese python	XP_007428415	234	30	44
Meleagris gallopavo	Wild turkey	XP_010710660	267	29	43
Pelodiscus sinensis	Chinese softshell turtle	XP_006120615	268	29	43
Haliaeetus albicilla	White tailed eagle	XP_009911401	266	33	48
Xenopus tropicalis	Western clawed frog	XP_004915565	226	31	45

Differences among shown orthologs suggest a slow rate of evolution.

== Protein ==
Chromosome 9 open reading frame 152 contains 239 amino acids. The molecular weight is 26.3 kilodaltons. The protein has a high chance of existing nuclear region of cells. There are likely no transmembrane regions. One isoform exists, containing 194 amino acids.

Within the coding sequence, there are two sumoylation sites and a single serine phosphorylation site.

There are three regions predicted to form alpha helices on the final protein.

== Expression ==
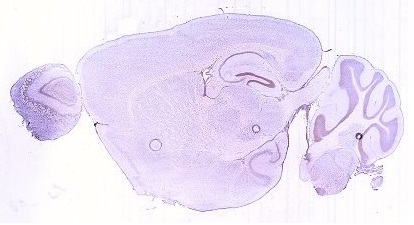
Expression of C9orf152 in the brain of a mouse via Allen Brain Atlas. The only area of high expression is the dark purple on the left, which is located in the olfactory bulb.

C9orf152 is expressed in the bladder, intestine, mammary gland, and trachea and in smaller amounts in the lungs, liver, prostate, uterus, and brain. Within the brain, expression of C9orf152 is limited to the olfactory bulb. Gene expression was found to increase in the presence of stress, including disease and heat stress.

A wide variety of transcription factors interact with the promoter of C9orf152, most notably two olfactory related factors (specifically, a neuron-specific olfactory factor and an olfactory associated zinc finger protein) and a negative glucocorticoid response element.
