= CCDC184 =

Protein found in humans

Identifiers
- Aliases: CCDC184, C12orf68, coiled-coil domain containing 184
- External IDs: MGI: 2146066; HomoloGene: 18612; GeneCards: CCDC184; OMA:CCDC184 - orthologs

Gene location (Human)
Chr.	Chromosome 12 (human)
Band	12q13.11	Start	48,183,644 bp
Band	12q13.11	End	48,185,926 bp

Gene location (Mouse)
Chr.	Chromosome 15 (mouse)
Band	15|15 F1	Start	98,065,039 bp
Band	15|15 F1	End	98,068,015 bp
RNA expression pattern
Bgee	Human / Mouse (ortholog); Top expressed in: prefrontal cortex; dorsolateral prefrontal cortex; Brodmann area 9; right frontal lobe; cingulate gyrus; anterior cingulate cortex; right hemisphere of cerebellum; hypothalamus; primary visual cortex; superior frontal gyrus / Top expressed in: facial motor nucleus; pontine nuclei; dorsal tegmental nucleus; medial vestibular nucleus; central gray substance of midbrain; superior colliculus; deep cerebellar nuclei; dorsomedial hypothalamic nucleus; olfactory epithelium; spinal cord; More reference expression data
BioGPS	n/a
Orthologs
Species	Human	Mouse
Entrez	387856	239650
Ensembl	ENSG00000177875	ENSMUSG00000029875
UniProt	Q52MB2	Q8BMK5
RefSeq (mRNA)	NM_001013635	NM_177716
RefSeq (protein)	NP_001013657	NP_808384
Location (UCSC)	Chr 12: 48.18 – 48.19 Mb	Chr 15: 98.07 – 98.07 Mb
PubMed search
- Wikidata
View/Edit Human	View/Edit Mouse

Coiled-coil domain-containing 184 (CCDC184) is a protein which, in humans, is encoded by the CCDC184 gene.

== Gene ==
Alias for the CCDC184 gene is C12orf68, chromosome 12 open reading frame 68. CCDC184 mRNA sequence, which is 2283 nucleotides in length, and is composed of 1 exon.

=== Expression ===
Human CCDC184 is primarily expressed in the components of the brain, such as hypothalamus, pons, pituitary gland. The gene's expression is enhanced and/or over-expressed in the brain tissue expression. Tissue expression cluster predicted Pituitary gland - Hormone signaling

== Protein ==
=== Overview ===
CCDC184 Protein is 194 amino acid and contains a domain of unknown function, DUF4677, which spans for 193 amino acid long . CCDC184 protein has a theoretical molecular weight of 20,484 dalton and an isoelectric point of 4.04. This indicates the acidic nature of the sequence. The molecular function of the protein is protein binding

=== Post translational Modification ===
CCDC184 contains various predicted post-translational modification domains, including phosphorylation, SUMOylation, Glutaredoxin, Myristoylation, Glutamic acid-rich region, and acetylation. The phosphosphorylation sites include S23, T24, and Y36.

Predicted Post Modification sites/domains of CCDC184 human protein.
Modification	Amino acid Region
Phosphorylation	76, 113, 155, 120, 122, 162
Myristoylation	103-108, 109-114, 124-129, 166-172
Glutaredoxin domain	1-62
Glutamic acid-rich region	136-146
SUMOylation	102-106, 183-187

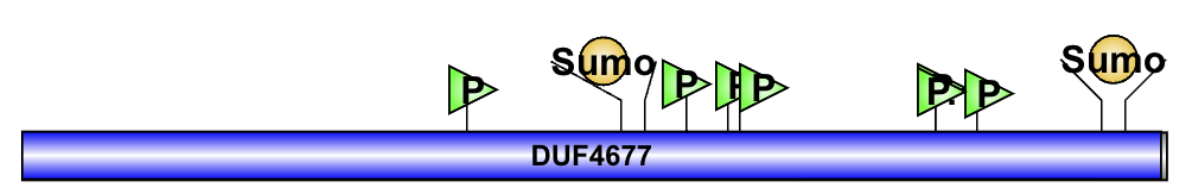
CCDC184 protein Domain, motif and post translational modification diagram

P = Phosphorylation site, Sumo: Sumo interacting regions, DUF4677: domain of unknown function

=== Structure ===
The human CCDC184 protein is predicted to be localized in the cytoplasm

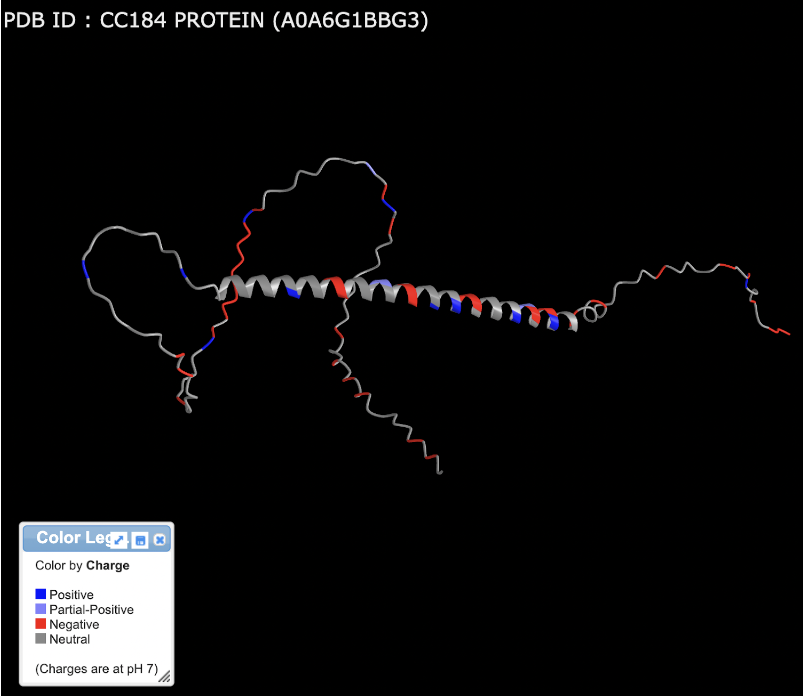
AlphaFold figure indicates 3D model of CCDC184. The colors indicate the charged regions of the structure.

AlphaFold figure indicates 3D model of CCDC184. The colors indicate the charged regions of the structure

=== Conceptual translation ===
The annotated elements shown in the conceptual translation for human CCDC184 protein is post-translational modifications, alpha helices, SUMOylation, Lysine acetylation, domain of unknown function.

== Homology ==
CCDC184 is found only in mammals. 183 organisms that have orthologs with the human gene CCDC184.

=== Table of Orthologs ===
Orthologs for CCDC184 are only found in mammals. The most distantly related species to human CCDC184 with a date of divergence of 160 MYA is the opossum. The Tasmanian devil also has a date of divergence of 160 MYA. The table indicates a various selection portion of the mammals' list.

Table of Orthologs
Taxonomic Order	Genus and Species	Common name	Accession number	Sequence length(aa)	Date of Divergence(MYA)	% Identity to the human protein	% Similarity to the human protein
Primate	Homo sapiens	Human	NP_001013657.3	194	0	100	100
Primate	Carlito syrichta	Philippine tarsier	XP_008067440.1	194	69	93.3	97.4
Scandentina	Tupaia chinensis	Chinese tree shrew	XP_006163517.1	85	85	89.7	93.8
Rodentia	Mus musculus	Mouse	NP_808384.2	191	87	90.2	82.8
Carnivora	Lontra canadensis	River otter	XP_032732811.1	193	94	93.8	96.9
Carnivora	Ursus americanus	American black bear	XP_045656783.1	195	94	94.9	96.9
Cetacea	Neophocaena asiaeorientalis asiaeorientalis	Finless porpoise	XP_024592814.1	195	94	92.8	95.9
Cetacea	Delphinapterus leucas	Beluga whale	XP_022428046.1	195	94	93.3	96.4
Artiodactyla	Camelus ferus	Bactrian camel	XP_006196007.2	195	94	94.9	97.4
Artiodactyla	Sus scrofa	Wild boar	XP_020948280.1	195	94	92.8	95.4
Chiroptera	Desmodus rotundus	Vampire bat	XP_024431436.1	195	94	90.3	93.8
Pilosa	Choloepus didactylus	Two-toed sloth	XP_037701005.1	196	99	88.8	92.9
Proboscidea	Elephas maximus indicus	Indian elephant	XP_049738921.1	197	99	89.3	94.9
Cingulata	Dasypus novemcinctus	Nine-banded armadillo	XP_004470453.1	192	99	90.2	93.3
Marsupial	Gracilinanus agilis	Agile gracile opossum	XP_044534020.1	186	160	72.8	80
Marsupial	Sarcophilus harrisii	Tasmanian devil	XP_031793886.1	187	160	69.2	77.6

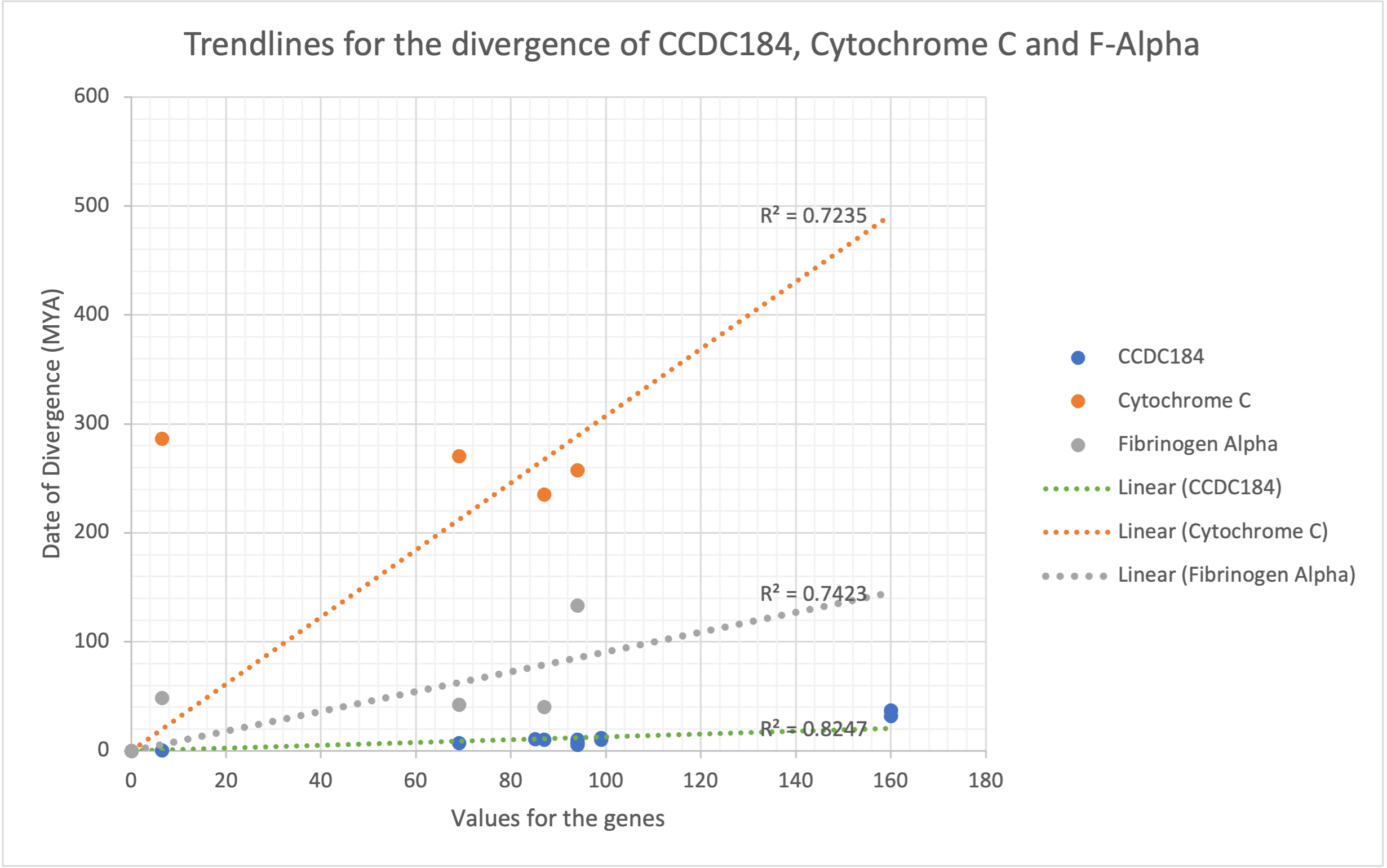
The figure indicates a chart showing the divergence of CCDC184, Cytochrome C and Fibrogen Alpha.

== Interaction and clinical significance ==
Predicted interactions for the CCDC184 gene were seen and the interactions revolved around enabling protein binding activity. Expressions of CCDC184 were connected to studies done on tissue samples for breast cancer somatic mutations
