= Philippine Tarsier Foundation =

Philippine non-profit corporation

Philippine Tarsier Foundation, Inc.
- Type: Environmental
- Industry: Environmentalism
- Founded: April 17, 1996, Philippines
- Headquarters: Tagbilaran City and Corella, Bohol, Philippines
- Key people: Carlito Pizarras; Jesus Alvarez; Fr. Florante S. Camacho, SVD; Anos Fonacier; Richard Uy; Marlito Uy; Mina Gabor
- Products: Lobbying, research, consultancy
- Website: www.tarsierfoundation.com

The Philippine Tarsier Foundation, Incorporated (PTFI) is a non-profit, non-stock corporation based in Tagbilaran City, Bohol, Philippines, established in 1996 to conserve, promote research, and establish a sanctuary for the Philippine tarsier.

Organized by local businessmen in Bohol, an island of 1.2 million people, the foundation runs an 8.4-hectare (20.7-acre) sanctuary or forest reservation, nestled within a larger protected forest where about a thousand other Philippine tarsiers are believed to live, protected by a permanent logging ban.

== Programs, projects, and activities ==
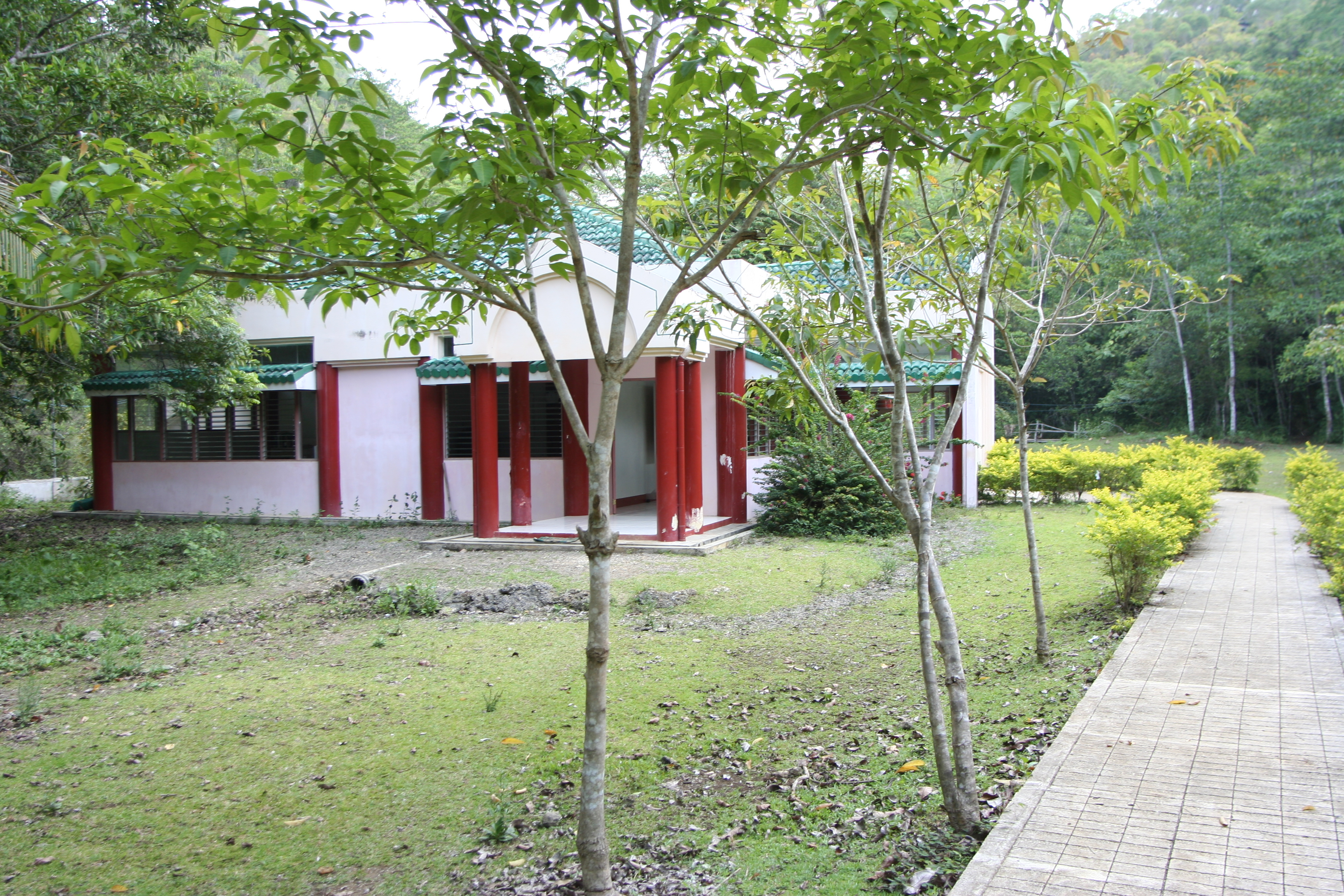
PTFI Tarsier Research and Development Center, Corella, Bohol

=== Tarsier research ===
The Philippine Tarsier Foundation undertakes the collection and cataloguing of all available research materials on the Philippine tarsier, from various institutions and agencies in the country and abroad, as well as the production of information and promotional materials.

=== Tarsier habitat management ===
The Foundation has designated approximately 134 hectares as public domain. To date, the Foundation has acquired 8.4 hectares of land in Canapnapan, Corella, Bohol for the sanctuary.

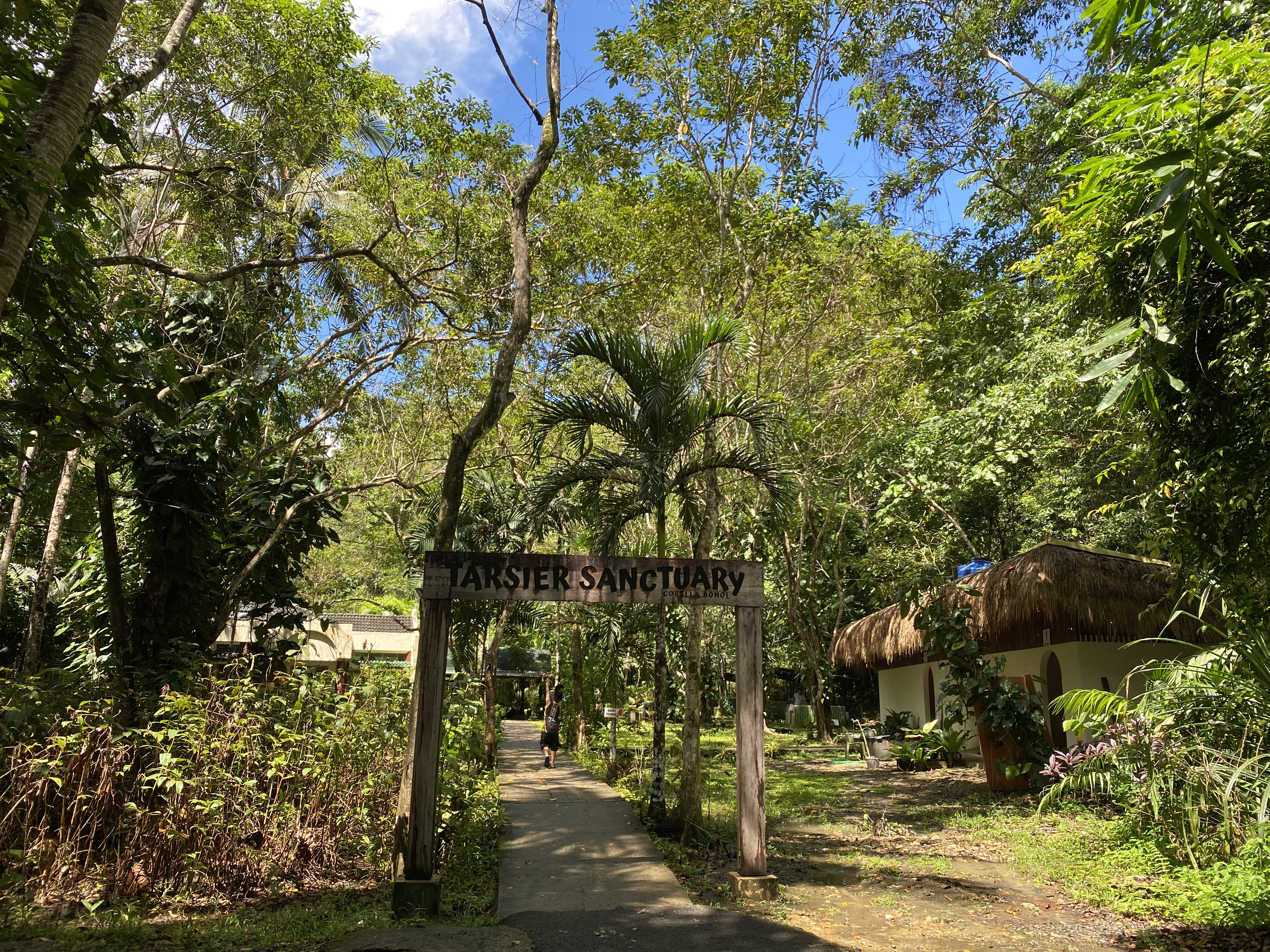
Entrance to the Philippine Tarsier Sanctuary in Corella, Bohol

Carlito Pizarras, dubbed as the "tarsier man", serves as the Field Supervisor of the sanctuary. As employee of the foundation, he assumes responsibility for the maintenance of the net enclosure and its inmates.

The foundation further coordinates the conduct of reforestation projects and other related activities or initiatives.

=== Community management ===
The foundation plans to expand and replicate the program in other areas with Philippine tarsier populations like Mindanao, Leyte, and Samar.

=== Visitor management ===
The Tarsier Research and Development Center is situated about 14 km. outside the provincial capital, Tagbilaran City, in the town of Corella, Bohol. It also serves as a visitor center.

=== Tarsier trail ===
The tarsier trail begins at the Tarsier Research and Development Center in Barangay Canapnapan, Corella, Bohol and covers a 134-hectare forested area.

== Foundation ==
=== Board of trustees and officers ===
On April 17, 1996, the Philippine Tarsier Foundation Inc. was registered with the Philippine Securities and Exchange Commission, with the following prominent Bohol residents listed as incorporators: the Rev. Florante Camacho, SVD, president of the Divine Word College of Tagbilaran; Anos Fonacier, municipal councilor of Panglao, Bohol and resort operator; and Col. (Ret.) Zosimo Angan, businessman. They were later joined by Richard Uy, banker, and Marlito Uy, department store owner. Elected principal officers were Fonacier as chairman; Camacho as president; and Jesus Alvarez, who is the only non-Boholano on the board, as executive vice-president.

The executive officers of the Board of Trustees and Officers of the Philippine Tarsier Foundation during its incorporation in 1996 were Fr. Florante S. Camacho, SVD, president; Jesus Alvarez, executive director; Urbano Lagunay, secretary; Marlito Uy, treasurer; and retired Col. Zosimo Angan as auditor. The Board of Trustees were Anos Fonacier, Chairman; Richard Uy, Vice Chairman; Honorary Chairperson was Secretary Mina Gabor of the Department of Tourism, and the first Executive Director/Office Manager was Mr. Jovito Danilo C. Nazareno. During his term, the Philippine Tarsier and Wildlife Sanctuary Visitor Center was built and, together with the help of Mr. Carlito Pizarras, tarsier trails were established, marketing and promotional activities of the area as an ecotourism destination were introduced, and linkages with other environmental organizations and funding agencies were established to support captive breeding. Other preservation activities were also conducted.

=== Carlito Pizarras ===
Carlito "Lito" Pizarras, known as the "Tarsier Man", is the Field Supervisor of the 8.4-hectare Philippine tarsier sanctuary run by the Philippine Tarsier Foundation in Barangay Canapnapan, Corella, Bohol. Hired by the foundation in 1998, he maintains the net enclosure and its 100 Philippine tarsier inmates. He also serves as a resource person and guide to visitors and researchers at the Research and Development Center.
