= Corella, Bohol =

Municipality in the Philippines

Corella
- Municipality
- Municipality of Corella
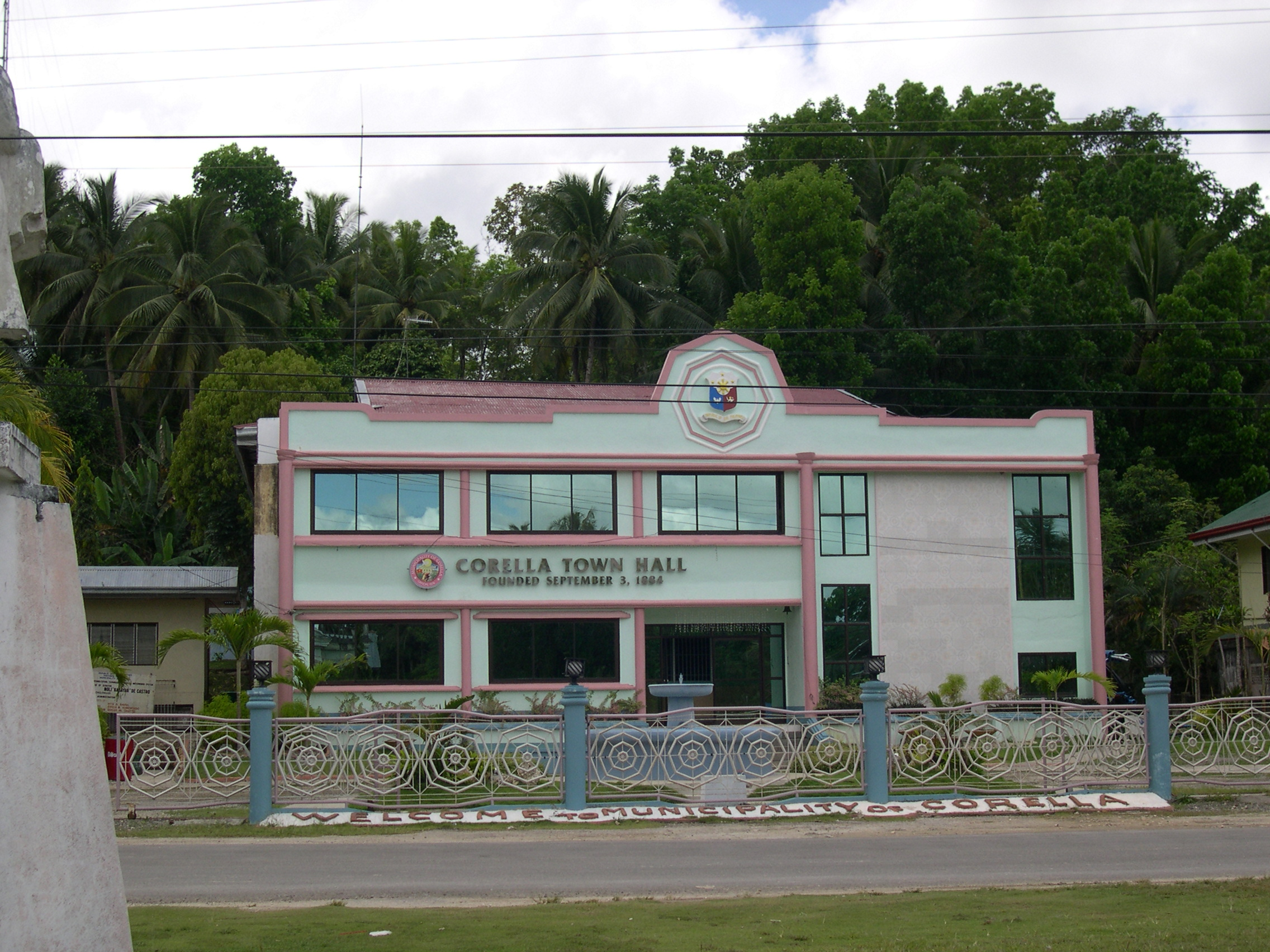
- Town Hall

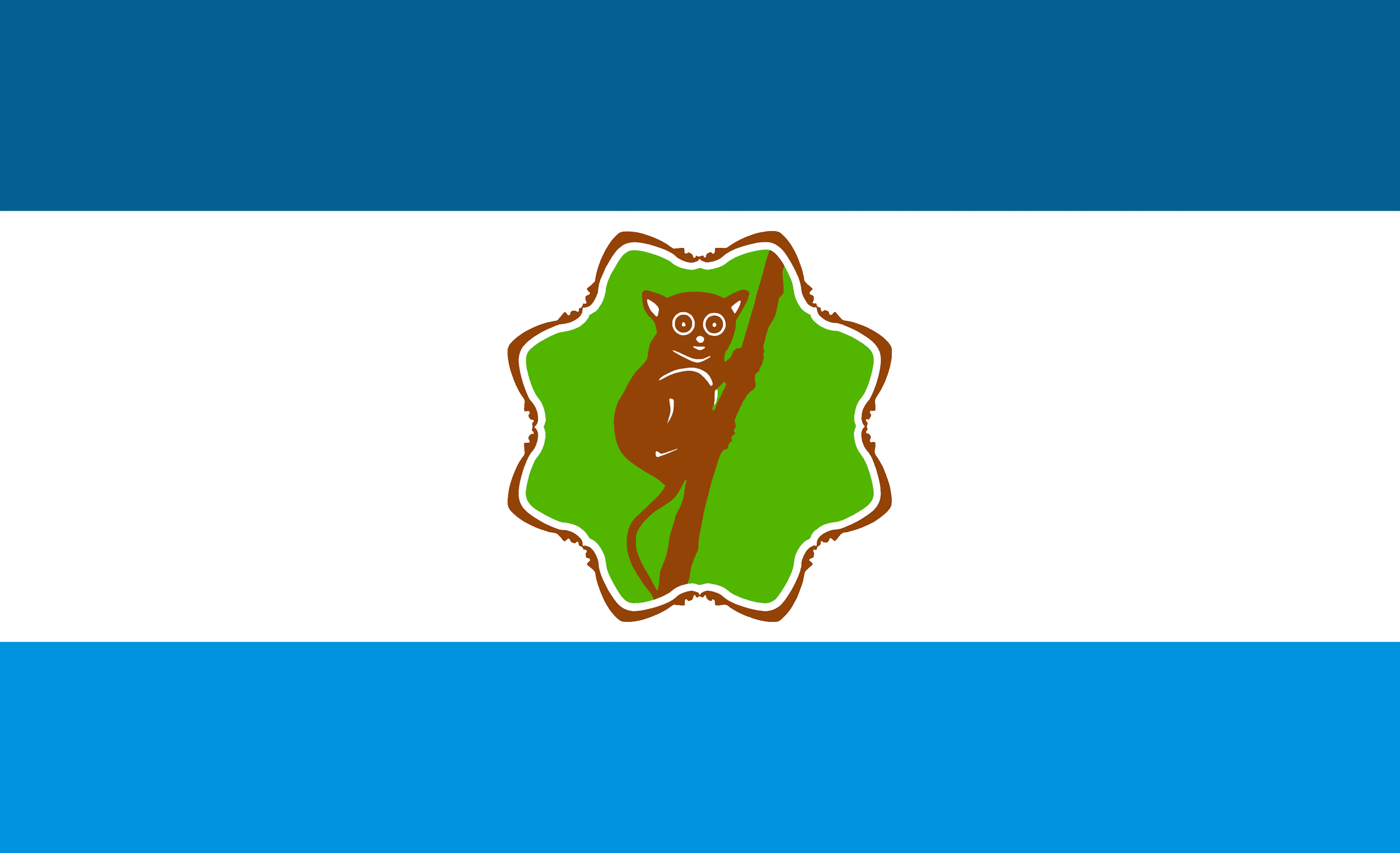
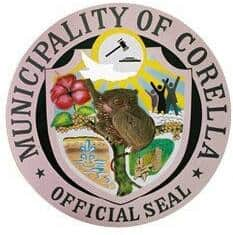
- Flag Seal

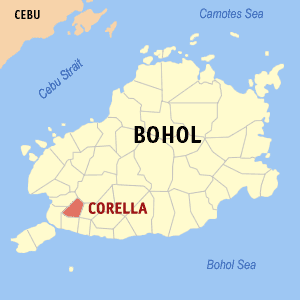
- Map of Bohol with Corella highlighted
- Interactive map of Corella
- Location within the Philippines
- Coordinates: 9°41′N 123°55′E
- Country: Philippines
- Region: Central Visayas
- Province: Bohol
- District: 1st district
- Founded: 3 December 1879
- Barangays: 8 (see Barangays)

Government
  - Type: Sangguniang Bayan
  - Mayor: Juan Manuel Y. Lim
  - Vice Mayor: Danilo D. Bandala
  - Representative: John Geesnell Yap
  - Municipal Council: Members: Rogelio C. Melloria; Nonita T. Lumain; Ronald Jose T. Malanog; Maria Asuncion B. Daquio; Ruben S. Fuentes; Victor D. Malayo; Dave Marc N. Rebuta; Marie Grace S. Alcala; NB
  - Electorate: 6,397 voters (2025)

Area
  - Total: 37.22 km^{2} (14.37 sq mi)
- Elevation: 79 m (259 ft)
- Highest elevation: 251 m (823 ft)
- Lowest elevation: 3 m (9.8 ft)

Population (2024 census)
  - Total: 9,889
  - Density: 265.7/km^{2} (688.1/sq mi)
  - Households: 2,192

Economy
  - Income class: 4th municipal income class
  - Poverty incidence: 9.83% (2023)
  - Revenue: ₱ 112 million (2024)
  - Assets: ₱ 261.4 million (2024)
  - Expenditure: ₱ 110.2 million (2024)
  - Liabilities: ₱ 40.93 million (2024)

Service provider
  - Electricity: Bohol 1 Electric Cooperative (BOHECO 1)
- Time zone: UTC+8 (PST)
- ZIP code: 6337
- PSGC: 071215000
- IDD : area code: +63 (0)38
- Native languages: Boholano dialect Cebuano; Tagalog

Corella, officially the Municipality of Corella (Cebuano: Munisipalidad sa Corella; Tagalog: Bayan ng Corella), is a municipality in the province of Bohol, Philippines. According to the 2024 census, it has a population of 9,889 people.

Located 10 kilometres (6.2 mi) northeast of Tagbilaran, it may have been named after a town in the province of Navarre in northern Spain.

Corella is known primarily as the home of the endemic Philippine tarsier, one of the world's smallest primates. The 7.4-hectare (18-acre) Philippine tarsier sanctuary run by the Philippine Tarsier Foundation, as well as the Research and Development Center, is in Canapnapan, three kilometres (1.9 mi) east of the centre of town.

The people of Corella are predominantly conservative Roman Catholics belonging to the parish of Our Lady of the Village whose feast is celebrated on 27 April.

== History ==
The municipality's former name was Nug‑as before it obtained its present name, Corella. It was then a barrio of Baclayon. The adoption of the name Corella was made at the behest of Fr. Jose Maria Cabañas del Carmen, then the parish priest of Baclayon, and endorsed by Fr. Felix Guillen de San Jose, the first Spanish priest. Corella was a name of a village in Navarra, Spain where this town's patroness, Nuestra Señora del Villar, showered miracles.

The creation of this town was due to the efforts of its inhabitants including Isidoro Ramo, who became its first gobernadorcillo.

The stone church and the convent were constructed during the tenure of Fr. Felix Gullen and completed by later priests, one of them being Fr. Dionisio Llorete who also spearheaded the erection of two stone school buildings and the municipal building during the term of the gobernadorcillo, Celedonio Sayon. But the construction of Corella's present concrete church began in 1924 under Fr. Pedro Montelbon, the parish priest of Tagbilaran who took over the administration of the Corella parish after the incumbent, Fr. Eugenio Desamparados, left.

In 1920, a conflict arose in the municipality between parish priest Simeon Sambola and municipal president Nicanor C. Tocmo over the administration of local schools. From the pulpit, Fr. Simeon publicly criticized the municipal government and denounced the school curriculum, which he claimed was improper. As a result, school enrollment declined significantly, with attendance largely limited to the families and close associates of President Tocmo. The local civil authorities subsequently raised the issue with provincial and national officials. Following a fact-finding investigation by the Department of Public Instruction, the report was submitted to the Governor-General, leading to the removal of Fr. Simeon from the parish.

During the Japanese occupation, the area at a distance halfway between Corella and Gaboc was "no-man's land". Several civilians were arrested there by the Japanese and executed on the spot. Honorio Butawan, a bolo volunteer, was caught by the enemy, and taken to Tagbilaran never to return. Other civilians of Corella suffered instant death from the Japanese as the latter tried to escape the US army of liberation.

In October 1944, Capt. Martin Maliwanag, a guerrilla leader under Major Ismael Ingeniero, established his headquarters in Corella, making the convent his command post and the primary school building east of the town plaza his detention cell. Several Filipino JCs (Japanese Constabulary) surrendered voluntarily. The first to surrender on 29 October 1944 was Lt. Victorio Sumodabila. He was shot on the spot by Capt. Maliwanag. Four other JCs from Corella who were killed and buried in the common grave of Corella were Dandong Lamayo, his brother Fermin Lamayo, Felicisimo Guscal, and his brother-in-law, Celistino Formentera. In all, there were nine Filipino JCs who met their violent deaths in Corella on orders of Capt. Maliwanag, who met his own death when he attacked the Japanese garrison in Gaboc. His body was buried in the same cemetery as his victims. It was Maliwanag's men who captured the puppet Japanese governor Agapito Hontanosas.

During the guerrilla period, Corella had four mayors closely succeeding each other:

- The Commonwealth-elected mayor Catalino C. Vale, who was suspected to be a Japanese puppet, was detained in Behind The Clouds (San Jose) in Batuan, where the Bohol Area Command (BAC) of the guerilla forces had its headquarters.
- Roman Calotes Tocmo who was named acting vice mayor by the guerillas and Tiburcio Aranas who was the acting mayor.
- After Aranas's death, Jose Clarin replaced him.
- When Clarin went on leave, he was substituted by Isaac Filo.

== Geography ==
=== Barangays ===
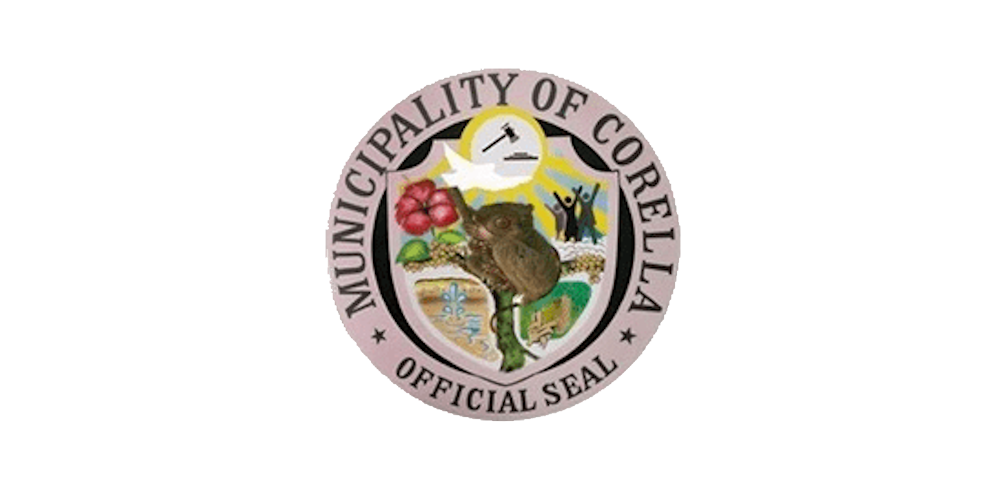
Former flag of Corella, used until 2023

At present, Corella is politically subdivided into 8 barangays. Each barangay consists of puroks and some have sitios.

All barangays are classified as rural.

| PSGC | Barangay | Population | | | ±% p.a. | |
| | | 2024 | | 2010 | | |
|---|---|---|---|---|---|---|
| 071215001 | Anislag | 14.5% | 1,434 | 1,233 | ▴ | 1.06% |
| 071215002 | Canangca‑an | 9.6% | 952 | 888 | ▴ | 0.48% |
| 071215003 | Canapnapan | 9.1% | 902 | 784 | ▴ | 0.98% |
| 071215004 | Cancatac | 9.5% | 943 | 921 | ▴ | 0.16% |
| 071215005 | Pandol | 7.2% | 713 | 640 | ▴ | 0.75% |
| 071215006 | Poblacion | 12.7% | 1,260 | 1,181 | ▴ | 0.45% |
| 071215007 | Sambog | 15.1% | 1,498 | 1,327 | ▴ | 0.85% |
| 071215008 | Tanday | 7.9% | 777 | 725 | ▴ | 0.48% |
| | Total | | 9,889 | 7,699 | ▴ | 1.76% |

=== Climate ===
Climate data for Corella, Bohol
| Month | Jan | Feb | Mar | Apr | May | Jun | Jul | Aug | Sep | Oct | Nov | Dec | Year |
|---|---|---|---|---|---|---|---|---|---|---|---|---|---|
| Mean daily maximum °C (°F) | 28 (82) | 28 (82) | 29 (84) | 31 (88) | 31 (88) | 30 (86) | 29 (84) | 29 (84) | 29 (84) | 29 (84) | 28 (82) | 28 (82) | 29 (84) |
| Mean daily minimum °C (°F) | 22 (72) | 22 (72) | 22 (72) | 23 (73) | 24 (75) | 24 (75) | 24 (75) | 24 (75) | 24 (75) | 23 (73) | 23 (73) | 22 (72) | 23 (74) |
| Average precipitation mm (inches) | 102 (4.0) | 85 (3.3) | 91 (3.6) | 75 (3.0) | 110 (4.3) | 141 (5.6) | 121 (4.8) | 107 (4.2) | 111 (4.4) | 144 (5.7) | 169 (6.7) | 139 (5.5) | 1,395 (55.1) |
| Average rainy days | 18.6 | 14.8 | 16.5 | 16.7 | 23.9 | 26.4 | 25.6 | 24.1 | 24.4 | 26.3 | 23.7 | 20.5 | 261.5 |
Source: Meteoblue (modeled/calculated data, not measured locally)

== Demographics ==
Population census of Corella
| Year | Pop. | ±% p.a. |
|---|---|---|
| 1903 | 5,005 | — |
| 1918 | 6,127 | +1.36% |
| 1939 | 5,676 | −0.36% |
| 1948 | 5,194 | −0.98% |
| 1960 | 4,583 | −1.04% |
| 1970 | 5,244 | +1.35% |
| 1975 | 5,286 | +0.16% |
| 1980 | 5,197 | −0.34% |
| 1990 | 6,150 | +1.70% |
| 1995 | 5,526 | −1.98% |
| 2000 | 6,048 | +1.95% |
| 2007 | 7,471 | +2.96% |
| 2010 | 7,699 | +1.10% |
| 2015 | 8,479 | +1.85% |
| 2020 | 9,479 | +2.37% |
| 2024 | 9,889 | +1.02% |
Source: Philippine Statistics Authority

From 1990, a marked decrease in population is noted. Groups of people migrated to other parts of the country, such as Mindanao, where they founded a new municipality, "New Corella".

== Economy ==
Poverty incidence of Corella (%)

Source: Philippine Statistics Authority

Corella does not have any major industry. A great majority of the people of the town are engaged in small-scale home businesses.

== Gallery ==
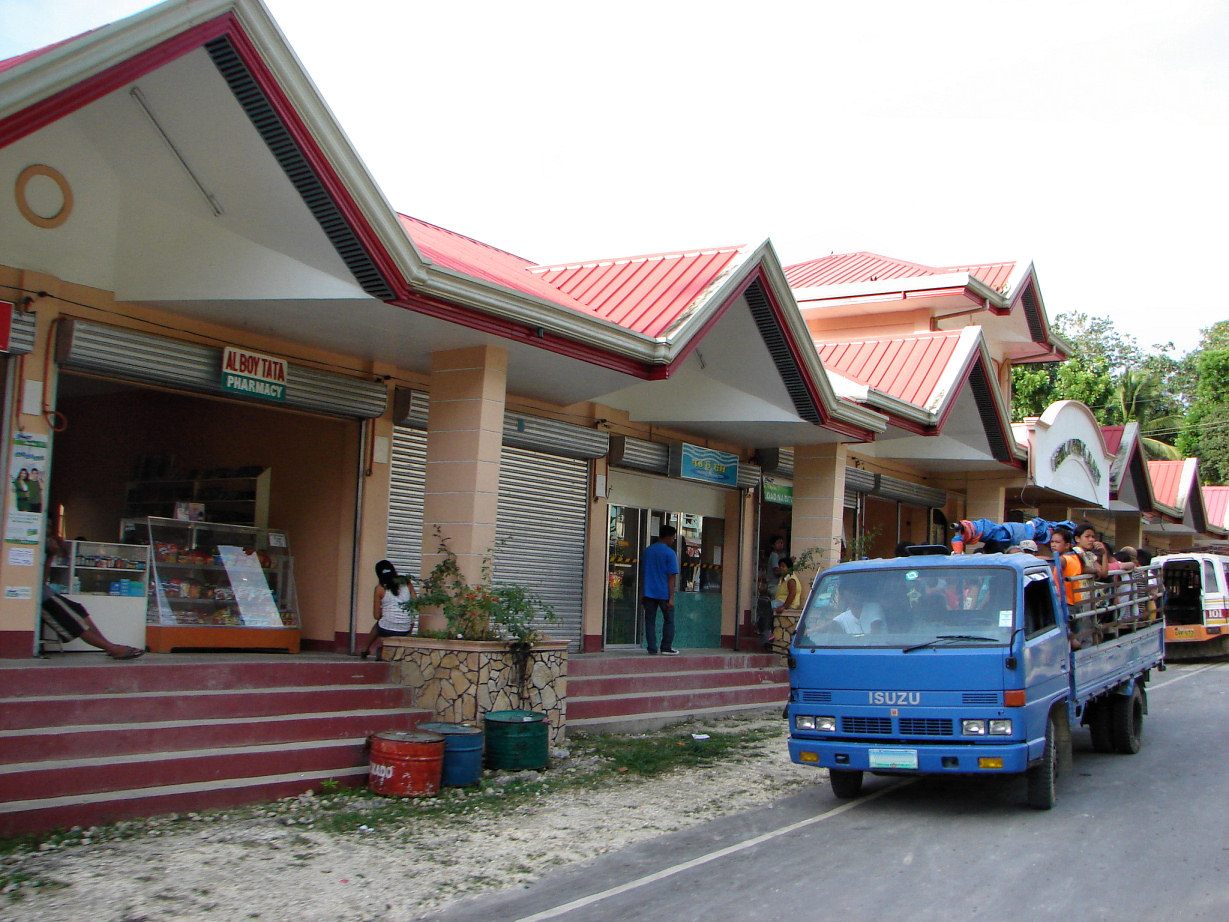
Public market

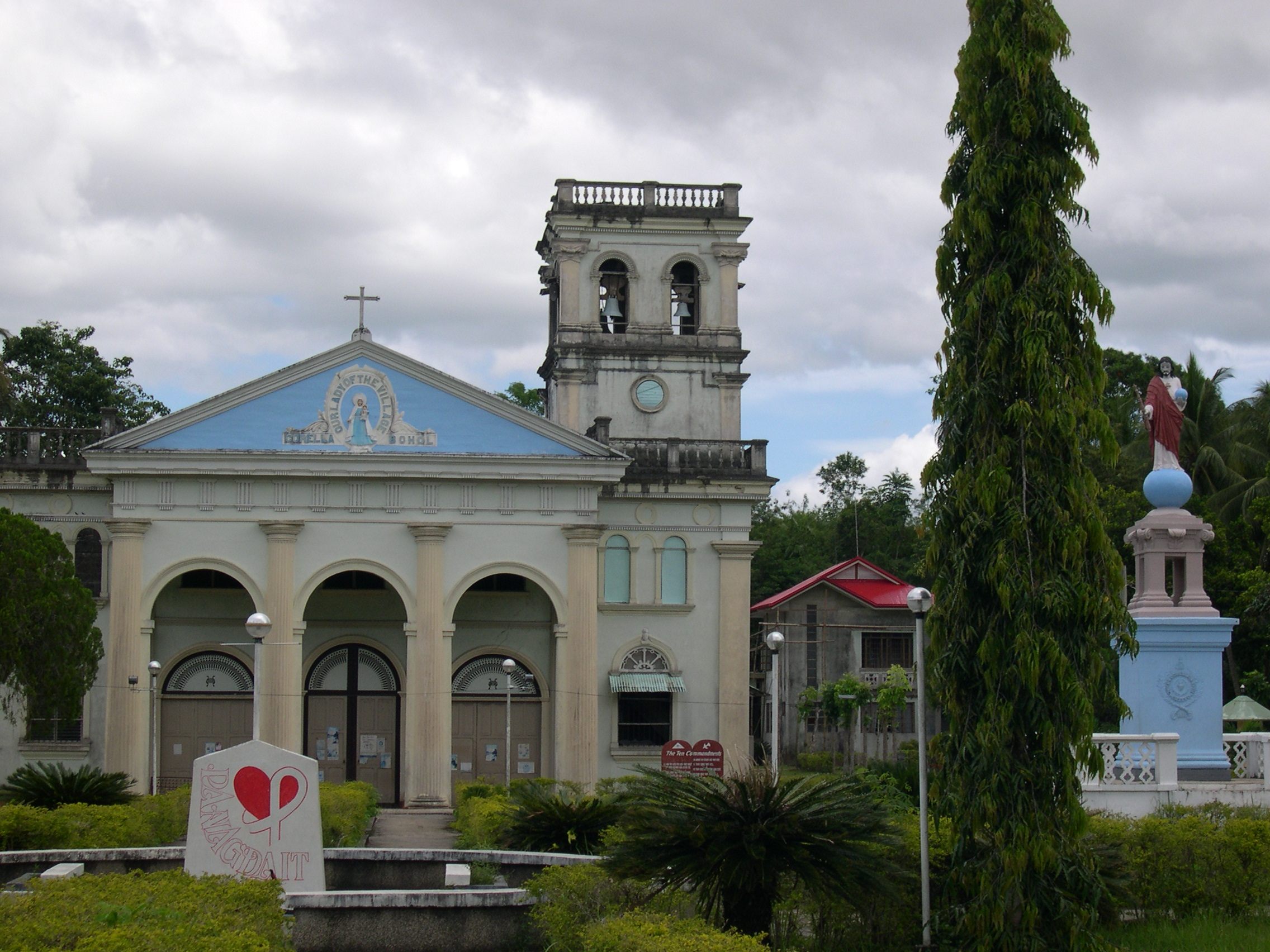
Church of Nuestra Señora del Villar

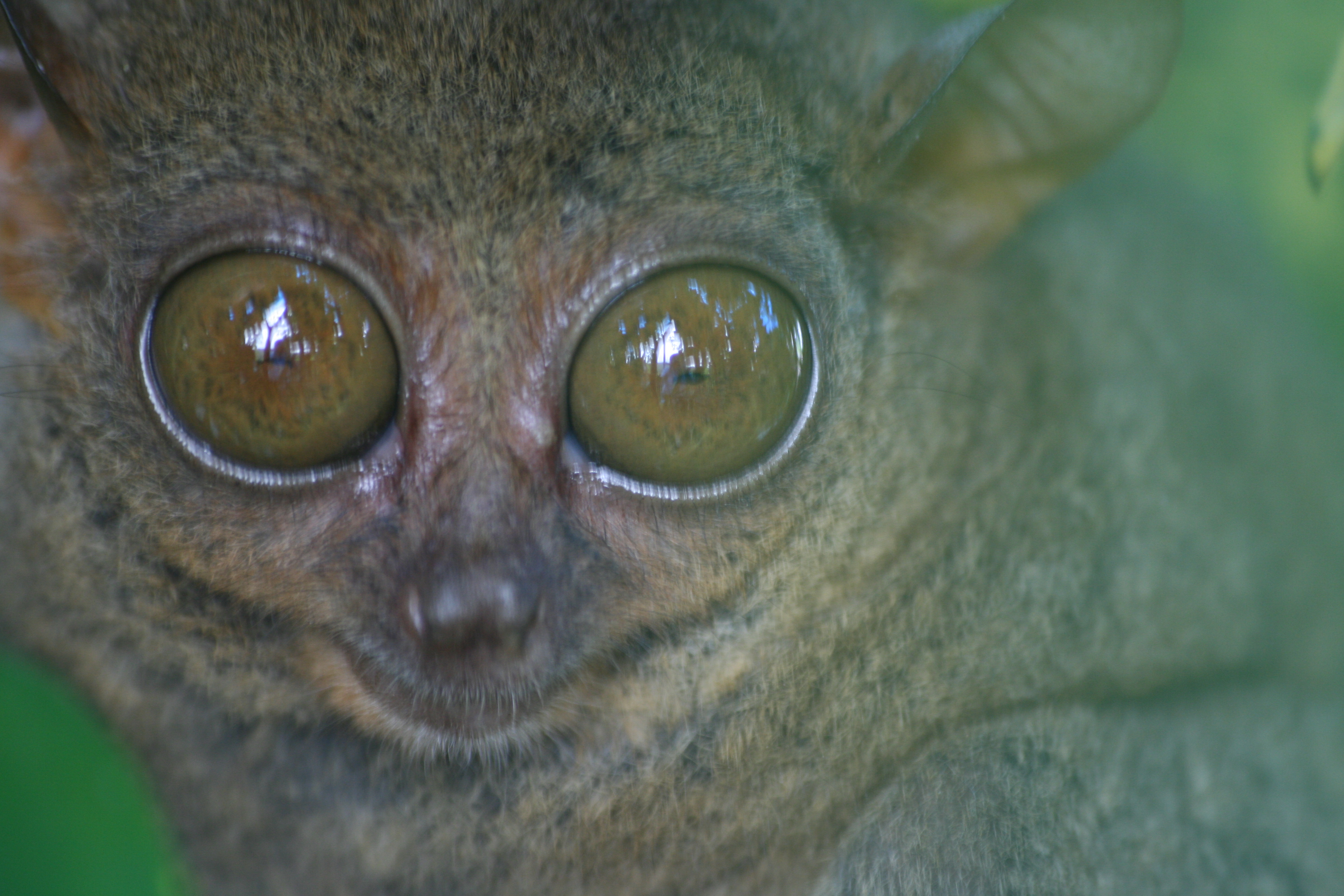
Philippine tarsier

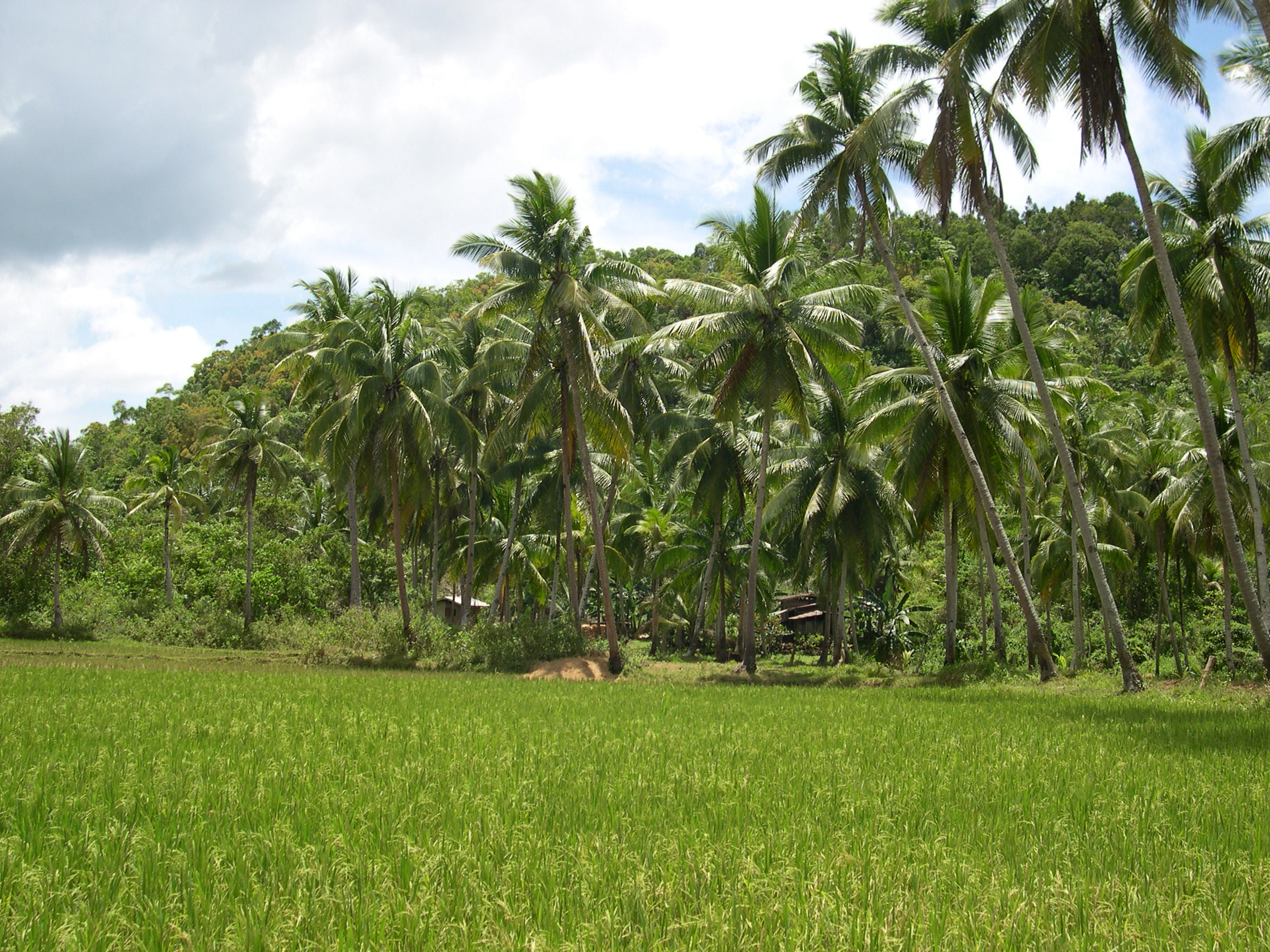
A rice field in Corella

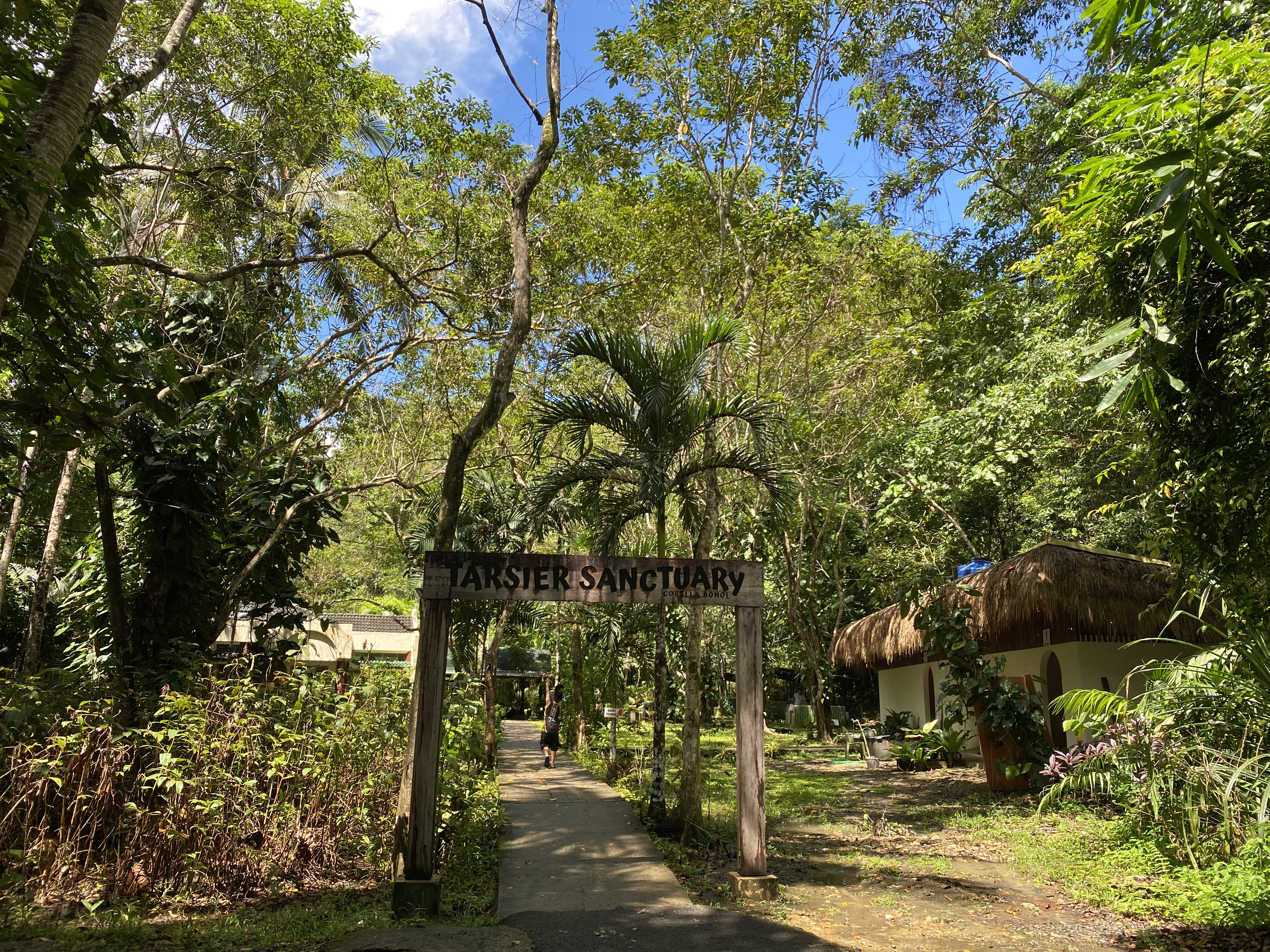
Philippine Tarsier Sanctuary entrance
