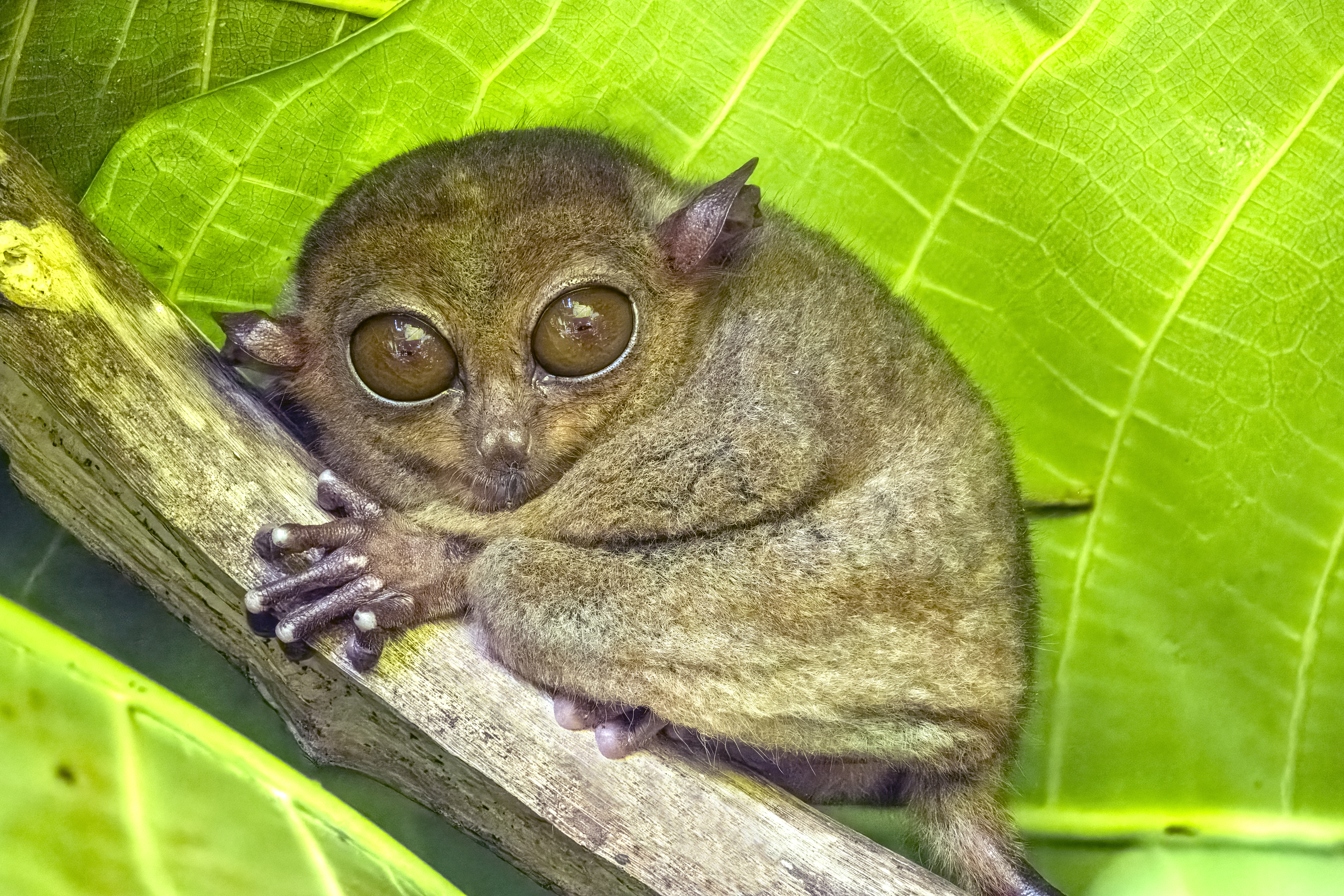

Conservation status
- Near Threatened (IUCN 3.1)

Scientific classification
- Kingdom: Animalia
- Phylum: Chordata
- Class: Mammalia
- Order: Primates
- Family: Tarsiidae
- Genus: Carlito; Groves & Shekelle, 2010
- Species: C. syrichta

Binomial name
- Carlito syrichta (Linnaeus, 1758)
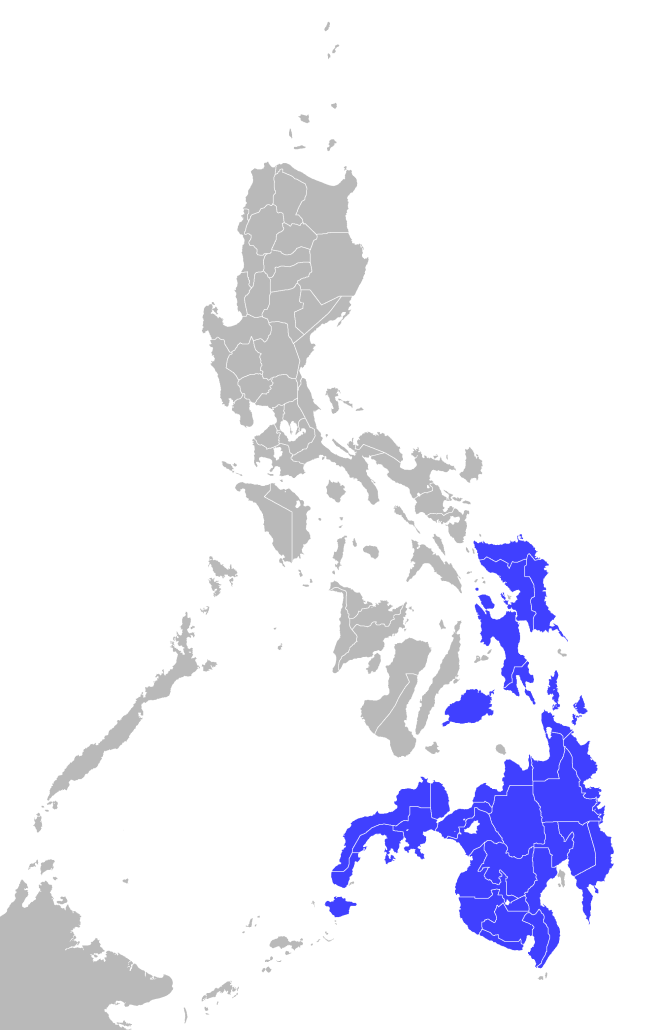
- Geographic distribution of Philippine tarsier

Synonyms
- Tarsius philippinensis Meyer, 1894; Simia syrichta Linnaeus, 1758

= Philippine tarsier =

Species of primate

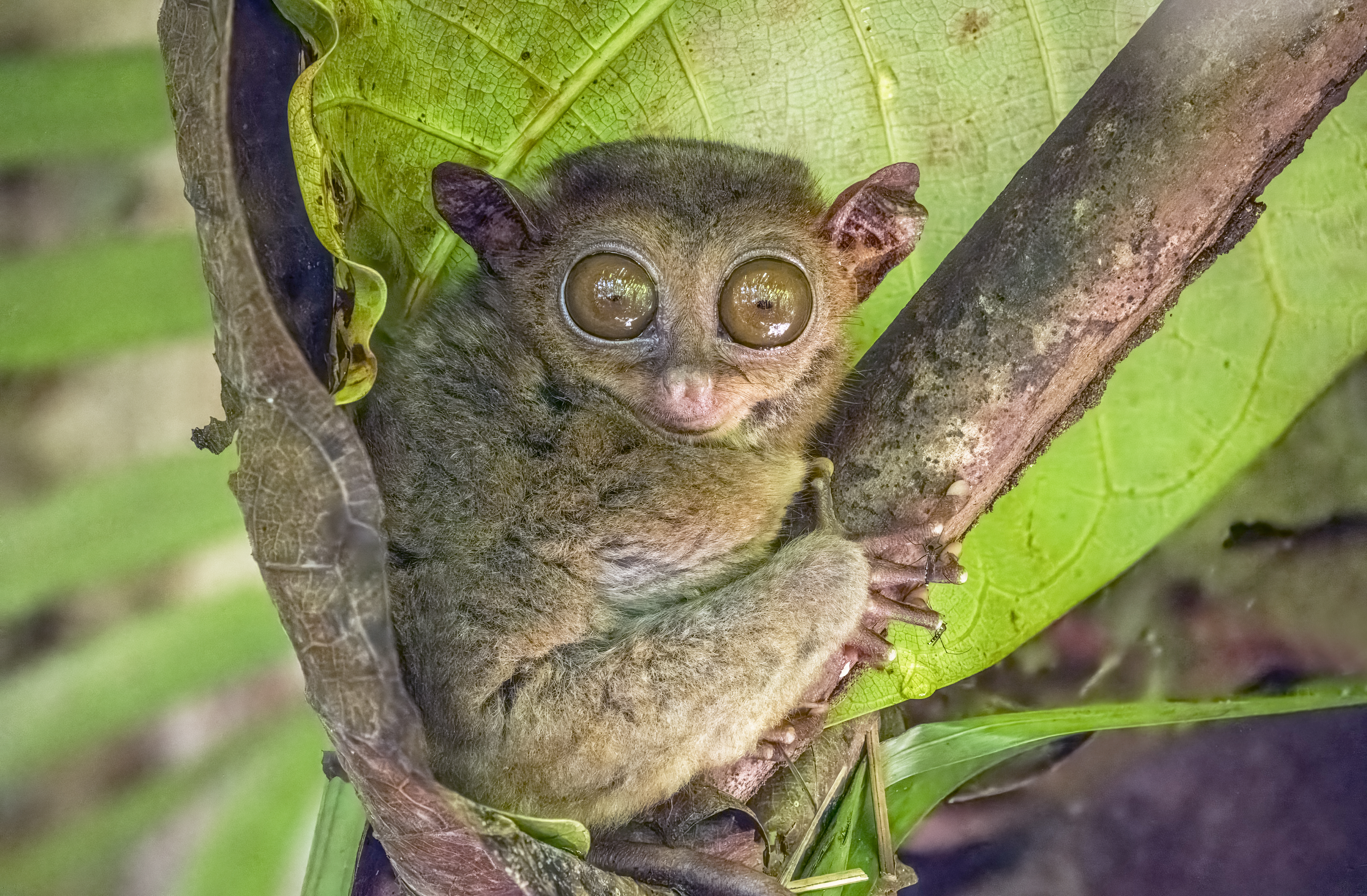
Philippine tarsier sitting in a branch

The Philippine tarsier (Carlito syrichta) is a species of tarsier endemic to the Philippines. It is found in the southeastern part of the archipelago, particularly on the islands of Bohol, Samar and Leyte. It is a member of the approximately 45-million-year-old family Tarsiidae, whose name is derived from its elongated "tarsus" or ankle bone. Formerly a member of the genus Tarsius, it has since been listed as the only member of the genus Carlito, a new genus named after the conservationist Carlito Pizarras.

Its geographic range also includes Maripipi Island, Siargao Island, Basilan Island and Dinagat Island. Tarsiers have also been reported in Sarangani, although they may be different subspecies.

== Etymology and taxonomic history ==
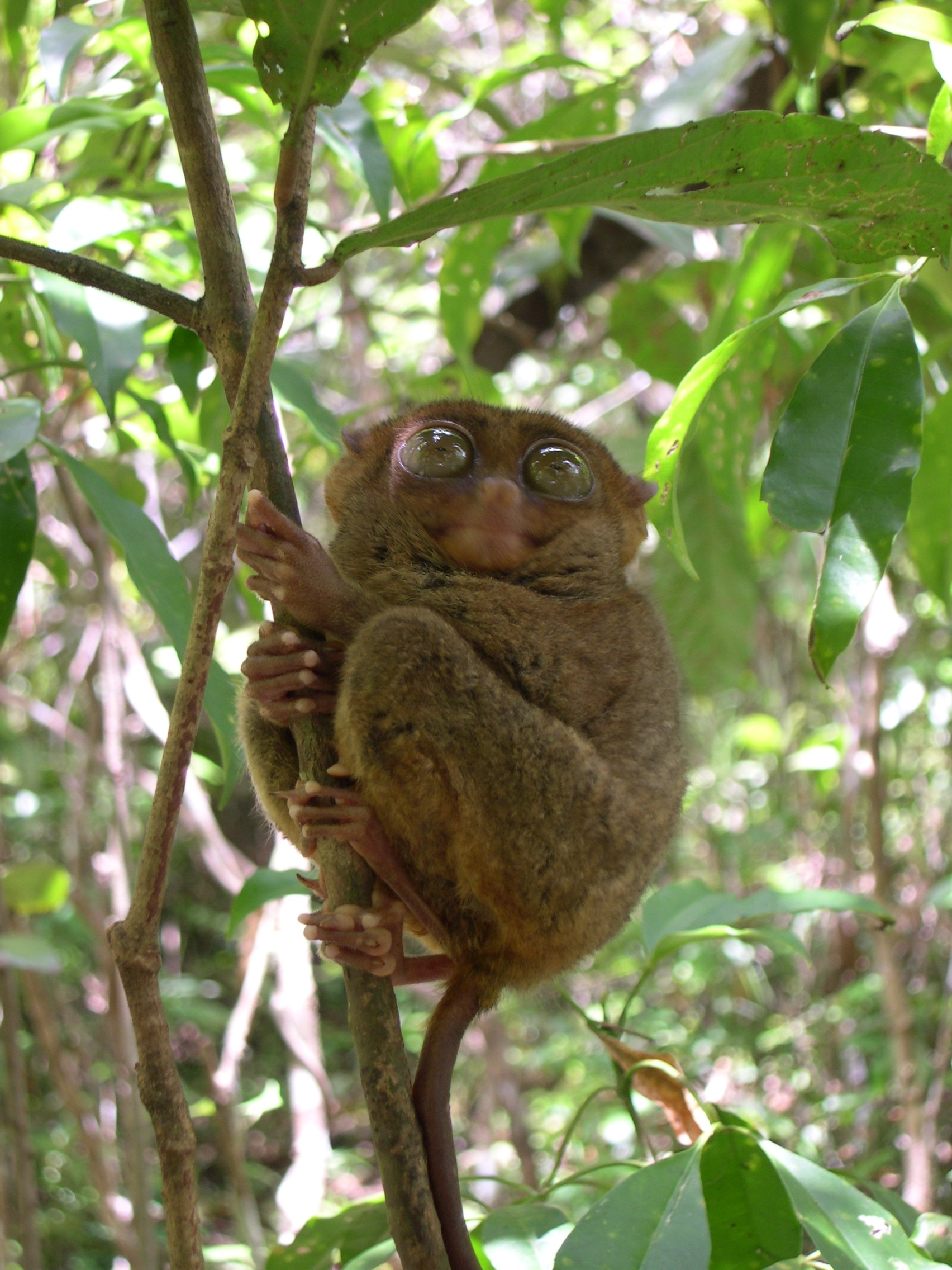
Philippine tarsier climbing a tree

The tarsier is named for its elongated "tarsus" or ankle bone. This tarsier is known locally as mawumag in Visayan languages including Cebuano, and magô in Waray. It is also known as mamag, magau, malmag, and magatilok-iok.

=== Taxonomic classification ===
The Philippine tarsier is the only member of the genus Carlito and a member of the family Tarsiidae. Three subspecies are recognised:

- Family Tarsiidae
  - Genus Tarsius: found in Sulawesi
  - Genus Cephalopachus: found in Sundaland
  - Genus Carlito: found in Greater Mindanao
    - Species Carlito syrichta
      - Subspecies Carlito syrichta syrichta from Leyte and Samar
      - Subspecies Carlito syrichta fraterculus from Bohol
      - Subspecies Carlito syrichta carbonarius from Mindanao

=== Changes in taxonomy ===
Previously all living tarsiers had been placed in the genus Tarsius, but a 2010 taxonomic revision by Shekelle and Groves placed the distinctive Philippine tarsier in its own genus, Carlito named after Filipino conservationist Carlito Pizarras.

The Philippine tarsier was introduced to Western biologists in the 18th century through the missionary J.G. Camel's description given to J. Petiver of an animal said to have come from the Philippines. Petiver published Camel's description in 1705 and named the animal Cercopithecus luzonis minimus which was the basis for Linnaeus' (1758) Simia syrichta and eventually Carlito syrichta, the scientific name as of 2010.

The IUCN taxonomic note lists two subspecies, but the non-nominate one is poorly defined at present, so the species is treated as a whole. Tarsius syrichta carbonarius and Tarsius s. fraterculus were recognized by Hill (1955) as weakly defined subspecies. Niemitz (1984) found the differences to be insignificant based upon comparisons with museum specimens. Musser and Dagosto (1987) felt that the available museum specimens were insufficient to resolve the issue, but mentioned that Heaney felt that a single male tarsier from Dinagat might be distinct. Groves (2001) did not recognize any subspecies of C. syrichta, but Groves and Shekelle (2010) recognized the subspecies C. s. fraterculus, C. s. syrichta, and C. s. carbonarius when splitting the species of Tarsius into Carlito.

== Anatomy and morphology ==
The Philippine tarsier measures 85 to 160 mm (3.35 to 6.30 in) in height, making it one of the smallest primates. The small size makes it difficult to spot. The mass for males is between 80–160 g (2.8–5.6 oz), usually lighter for females, somewhat heavier than other tarsiers such as the pygmy tarsier. The average adult is about the size of an adult human fist.

The female tarsier has multiple sets of breasts, but the only functional set is at the pectoralis. The other breasts are used as anchor points for the newborn tarsiers. The gestation period lasts 180 days, or 6 months, after which only one tarsier is born. The newborn tarsier is born with much fur and eyes open. Its body and head length is about 70 mm (2.8 in), and its tail is around 115 mm (4.5 in) long.

Like all tarsiers, the Philippine tarsier's eyes are fixed in its skull; they cannot move in their sockets. Instead, a special adaptation in the neck allows its round head to be rotated 180°. Their eyes are disproportionately large, having the largest eye-to-body weight ratio of all mammals. These huge eyes provide this nocturnal animal with excellent night vision. In bright light, the tarsier's eyes can constrict until the pupil appears to be only a thin spot. In low light or darkness, the pupil can dilate and fill up almost the entire eye. The large membranous ears are mobile, appearing to be almost constantly moving, allowing the tarsier to hear any movement.

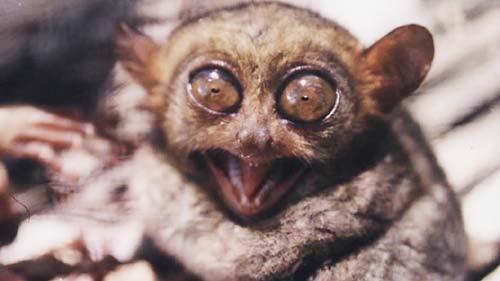
Philippine tarsier, showing lower jaw dentition

The Philippine tarsier has thin, rough fur which is colored gray to dark brown. The narrow tail, usually used for balance, is bald except for a tuft of hair at the end, and is about twice the body length. Its elongated "tarsus", or ankle bone, which gives the tarsier its name, allows it to jump at least 3 m (9.8 ft) from tree to tree. Its long digits are tipped with rounded pads that allow C. syrichta to cling easily to trees and to grip almost any surface. The thumb is not truly opposable, but the first toe is. All of the digits have flattened nails, except for the second and third toes, which have sharp claws specialized for grooming.

Their dental formula is 2:1:3:31:1:3:3, with relatively small upper canines.

== Ecology ==
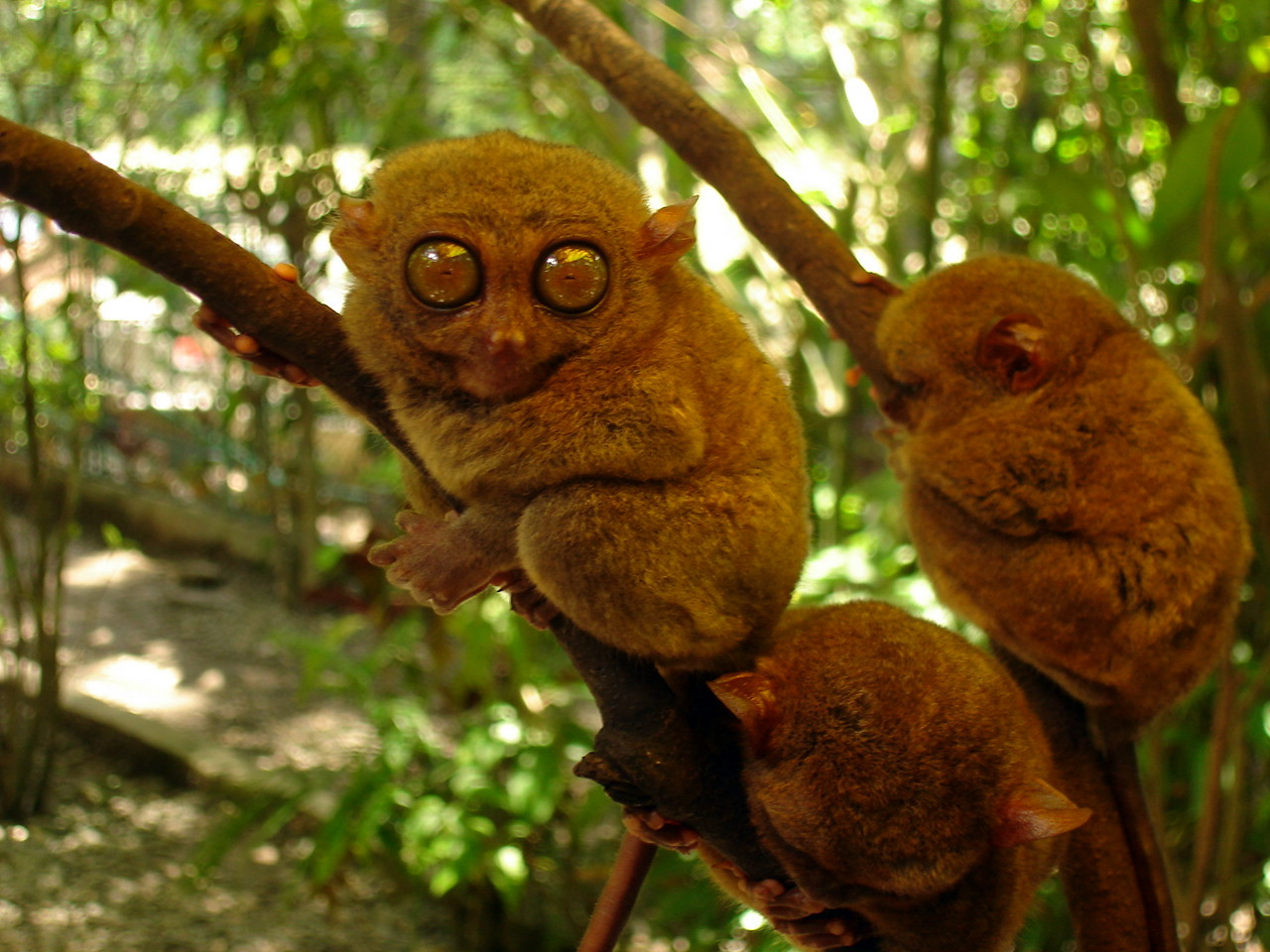
Philippine tarsiers in Bohol

The Philippine tarsier is primarily insectivorous, its diet consists of insects, spiders, small crustaceans, and small vertebrates such as small lizards and birds. C. syrichta preys on live insects, particularly crickets and grasshoppers. Upon seizing its prey, the tarsier carries it to its mouth using both hands.

=== Geographic range and habitat ===
The Philippine tarsier, as its name suggests, is endemic to the Philippine archipelago. C. syrichta populations are generally found in the southeastern part of the archipelago. Established populations are present primarily on the islands of Bohol, Samar, Leyte and Mindanao. It has also been found on various isolated islands within its known range, such as Maripipi Island, Siargao Island, Basilan Island and Dinagat Island.

The Philippine tarsier's habitat is the second-growth, secondary forest, and primary forest from sea level to 700 m (2,300 ft). Its habitat also includes tropical rainforest with dense vegetation and trees that offer it protection such as tall grasses, bushes, and bamboo shoots. It prefers dense, low-level vegetation in secondary forests, with perching sites averaging 2 m (6 ft 7 in) above the ground.

Early studies showed that the Philippine tarsier has a home range of 1 to 2 hectares (2.5 to 4.9 acres), but more recent research shows that home ranges averaged 6.45 ha (15.9 acres) for males and 2.45 ha (6.1 acres) for females, allowing for a density of 16 male and 41 female tarsiers per 100 ha (250 acres).

Both males and females are solitary, but will occasionally cross paths at night. They travel up to 1.5 km (0.93 mi) across the forest and the optimal area is more than 6 ha (15 acres).

=== Predators ===
Besides human hunters, feral cats banished from nearby communities are the species' main predators, though some large birds are known to prey on it as well. Because of its nocturnal and arboreal habits, the Philippine tarsier is most likely to fall prey to owls, or to small carnivores which it can encounter in its canopy homes.

== Behavior ==
The Philippine tarsier is a shy, nocturnal animal that leads a mostly hidden life. During the day, it sleeps in dark hollows close to the ground, near tree trunks and shrubs deep in the impenetrable bushes and forests. It becomes active only at night; with its keen sight and ability to manoeuvre around trees, it is able to avoid humans.

It is arboreal, habitually clinging vertically to trees and capable of leaping from branch to branch.

The Philippine tarsier is solitary. However, populations and individuals have been found to have either monogamous or polygamous mating patterns.

=== Communication ===
Three different audible calls have been documented. One is its "loud call"—a piercing single note. The second sound is a soft, sweet, bird-like twill, a sound of contentment. When several tarsiers come together, the combined effect of this chirping is a locust-like sound.

These mammals can also vocalize in an ultrasound frequency range of 70 kHz and can pick up frequencies above 90 kHz. This form of vocal communication is used as a distress call made by infants when they are separated from their mothers. It is also the call made by males to their mates during mating season.

Tarsiers also communicate through a scent from the circumoral gland located around the mouth, which the female uses to mark her mate. The males mark their territory with their urine. Tarsiers perform tactile communication through social grooming, removing dead skin and parasites, a behaviour observed in females on adult males, as well as in females on their offspring.

=== Reproduction ===
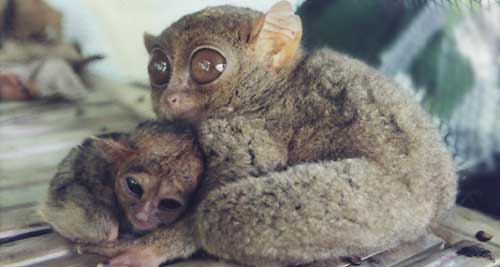
Tarsier with a baby

The Philippine tarsier's gestation period lasts about six months, while the female's estrous cycle lasts 25–28 days. The mating season lasts from April to May. The males deposit a mating plug in the female's vagina after intercourse. The female gives birth to one offspring per gestation. The infant is born with hair and with its eyes open. The females carry their infants in their mouths. A newborn can already cling to branches and in less than a month after birth, it can start leaping.

Newborns are breastfed until 60 days after birth. After two years of age, the tarsier is sexually mature and able to reproduce.

== Status ==
In 1986, 1988, and 1990, the Philippine tarsier was assessed as endangered by the IUCN Conservation Monitoring Centre. On September 13, 1991, the Department of Environment and Natural Resources issued DENR Administrative Order Number 48 (DAO 48), which also listed the Philippine tarsier as endangered.

In 1996, it was assessed as lower risk/conservation-dependent by Baillie and Groom-bridge. In 2000, the IUCN assessed the Philippine tarsier as data deficient, which means that inadequate information was available to make a direct or indirect assessment of its risks of extinction based on its distribution and/or population status.

The most recent IUCN red list assessment, in 2008, classified the Philippine tarsier as near threatened. This classification is based on an estimated significant decline over the last three generations (about 20 years), but less than 30%, due to habitat loss and because of poaching for the pet trade.

The Philippine tarsier is listed in Appendix II of CITES, and the U.S. Endangered Species Act classifies it as threatened.

A tarsier sanctuary is maintained in the town of Corella (Bohol). Run by the Philippine Tarsier Foundation, it has a visitor centre and habitat preserve with an area of 7,000 m^{2} (75,000 sq ft) in a natural forest.

=== Threats in the wild ===
For the past 45 million years, tarsiers have inhabited rainforests around the world, but modern examples exist on only a few islands in the Philippines, Borneo, and Indonesia. In Bohol, the Philippine tarsier was a common sight in the southern part of the island until the 1960s. Since then, the number has dropped to around 700 on the island according to the Philippine Tarsier Foundation.

Due to the quickly growing human population, which causes more and more forests to be converted to farmland, housing areas, and roads, the place where the Philippine tarsier can live its secluded life is disappearing. The dwindling of Philippine forests—the Philippine tarsier's natural forest habitat—has posed a grave and significant threat to the survival of the Philippine tarsier. Indiscriminate and illegal logging, cutting of trees for firewood, kaingin or slash and burn method of agriculture, and human urbanization have encroached on the habitats of the tarsier.

Paradoxically, indigenous superstition, coupled with relatively thick rainforest, particularly in Sarangani province, has apparently preserved this endangered species. Indigenous tribes leave the Philippine tarsiers in the wild because they fear that these animals could bring bad luck.

=== Survival in captivity ===
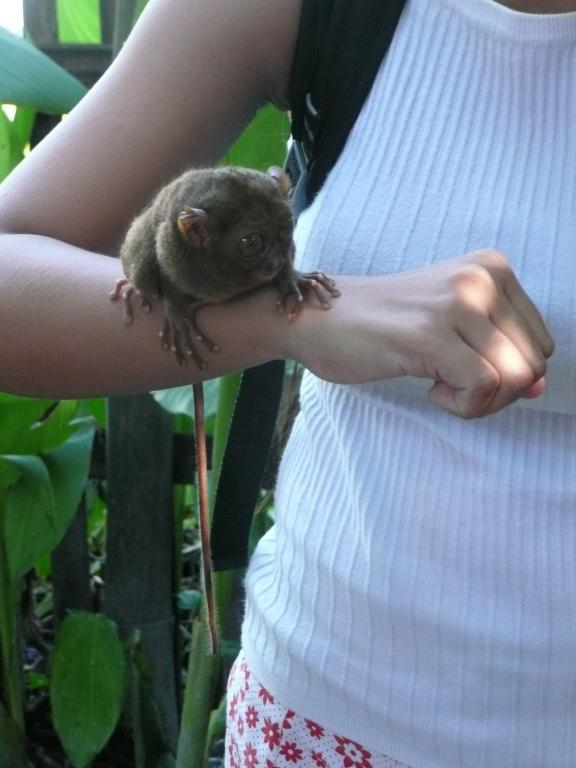
A Philippine tarsier resting on a human arm for size comparison.

Tarsiers in the Philippines have been sought out as pets or sold for trade, despite their low survival rate outside of their natural habitat, where they feed on live insects. Private displays by people in Loboc, Bohol tend to diminish the lives of tarsiers. Further, the display of captive tarsiers might encourage tourists to acquire them illegally as pets.

Tarsiers do not do well in captivity. Life expectancy decreases by 2 to 12 years (if taken from the wild), as compared to the 24 years the tarsier can live to in the wild. The tarsier can develop sore eyes, which is an indication of a poor diet. Also, the lighting usually used in captivity can cause long-lasting damage to the eyes. Another danger of captivity is the creature's tendency to commit suicide. Because the tarsier is often shy and nervous, many activities associated with captivity (such as camera flashes, being touched, and being kept in an enclosure) stresses the animal. Such stress leads to the tarsier hitting its head against objects, thus killing it because of its thin skull.

=== Conservation legislation ===
Several laws have been passed to protect and conserve the Philippine tarsier. DENR Administrative Order No. 38, Series of 1991 (DAO No. 38) included the Philippine tarsier among the national protected wildlife species and proposed its listing under Appendix 1 of the Convention on International Trade in Endangered Species (CITES). Moreover, the IUCN/SSC Primate Specialist Group had given the species Conservation Priority Rating 4, which means that the species is highly vulnerable and threatened by habitat destruction and/or hunting.

Republic Act No. 7586, otherwise known as the National Integrated Protected Areas System (NIPAS) Act of 1991 mandates the establishment of appropriate sanctuaries to preserve and protect the Philippine tarsier.

Proclamation 1030 was enacted on June 23, 1997, declaring the Philippine tarsier a specially protected faunal species.

Also, legislation at other local levels includes provincial ordinances and proclamations (Bohol Province), municipal ordinances (Corella), and Barangay ordinances (Canapnapan, etc.).

On July 30, 2001, Republic Act No. 914, also known as the Wildlife Resources Conservation and Protection Act, was enacted. The law provided for the conservation and protection of wildlife resources and their habitats, including the Philippine tarsier, and its inclusion as a flagship species.

=== Conservation initiatives ===
Two groups are involved in the conservation of the Philippine tarsier: Endangered Species International (ESI) and the Philippine Tarsier Foundation. ESI works in Mindanao Island where the conservation group created a tarsier sanctuary, planted endangered trees to reforest tarsier habitat, and conducts research and educational activities. In partnership with local groups and government, ESI established the tarsier trail including a viewpoint on habitat. Interpretative boards about plants and animals found in the sanctuary are displayed.
