= Oberlandesgericht =

German appellate courts

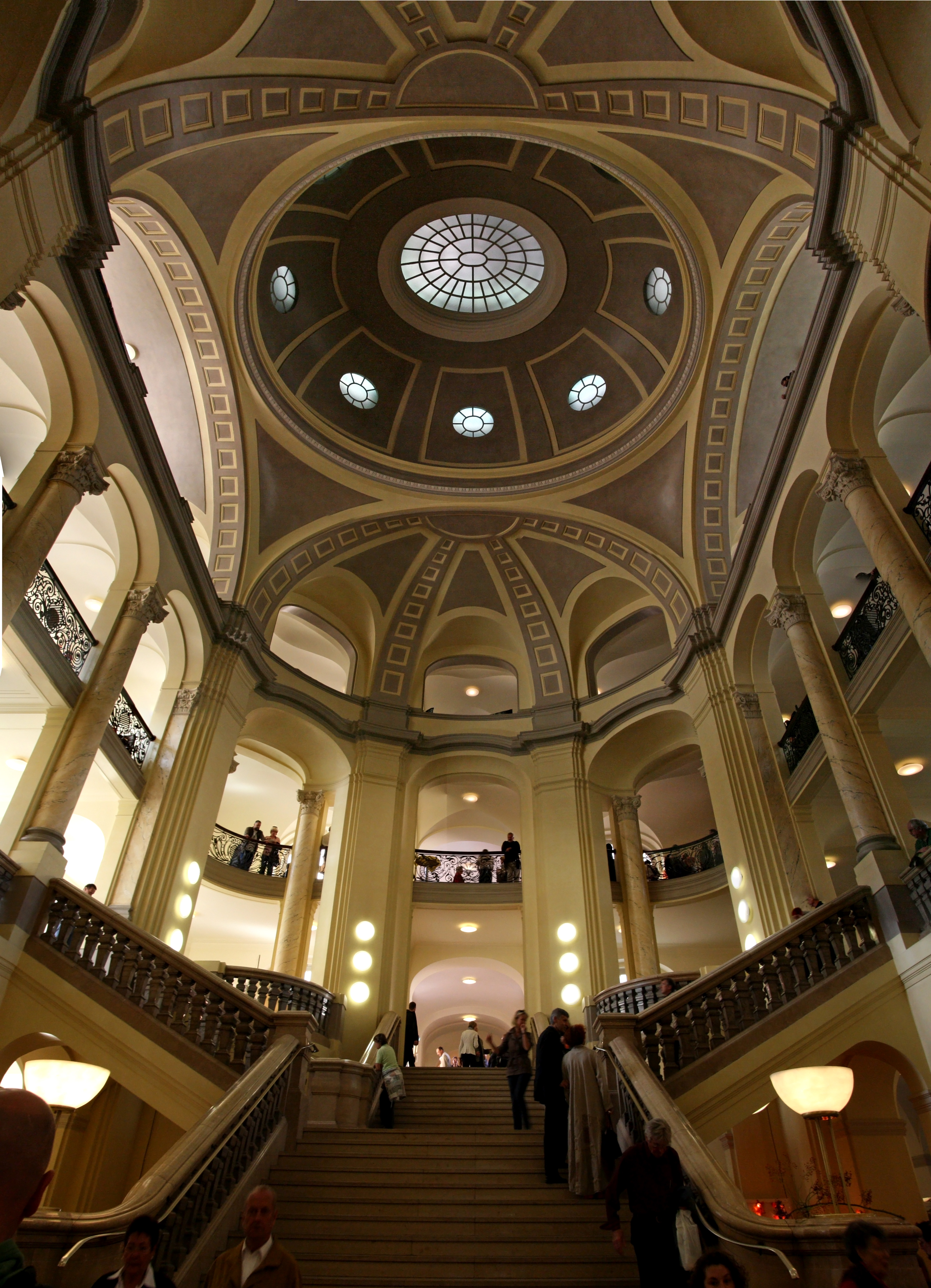
Interior of the Cologne OLG

An Oberlandesgericht (German: [ˈoːbɐˌlandəsɡəʁɪçt]; plural – Oberlandesgerichte pronounced [ˈoːbɐˌlandəsɡəʁɪçtə]; OLG, English: Higher Regional Court, (Note: The usual English translation of Oberlandesgericht is "Higher Regional Court". See for example the official web site of the Higher Regional Court of Düsseldorf (Oberlandesgericht Düsseldorf), retrieved on April 29, 2015.) or in Berlin Kammergericht: KG) is a higher court in Germany.

There are 24 Oberlandesgerichte in Germany and they deal with civil and criminal matters. They are positioned above regional courts (Landgerichte) and below the Federal Court of Justice (Bundesgerichtshof), in family and child law above the local courts (Amtsgericht) and below the Federal Court of Justice. In the Oberlandesgerichte, the offices of the Generalstaatsanwaltschaft (German: [ɡenəˈʁaːlˌʃtaːt͡sʔanvaltʃaft]) or district attorney general are located. In criminal cases that are under primary jurisdiction of the Federal Court of Justice (i.e., cases concerning national security), the Oberlandesgerichte act as branches of the Federal Court of Justice, that is, as "lower federal courts" (Untere Bundesgerichte).

As per Section 120 Courts Constitution Act, OLGs have original jurisdiction (Erstinstanz) over crimes against public international law under the Völkerstrafgesetzbuch (genocide, crimes against humanity, and war crimes). This includes trials under universal jurisdiction (that were committed by non-Germans outside of Germany).

The OLG Düsseldorf is one of the most popular patent trial forums for patentees in Europe.

The Oberlandesgerichte were first set up in the German Empire by the Courts Constitution Act of 27 January 1877. In Prussia, there had been Oberlandesgerichte as the higher provincial courts since 1808, known as Regierung from 1723 to 1808.

== The individual Higher Regional Courts ==
As of 2023 there are 24 Higher Regional Courts in Germany. Each German state has at least one Higher Regional Court. Baden-Württemberg and Rhineland-Palatinate each have two, Bavaria, Lower Saxony and North Rhine-Westphalia each have three Higher Regional Courts.

For historical reasons the Higher Regional Court in Berlin is called the Kammergericht and the Higher Regional Courts in Hamburg and Bremen are called Hanseatic Higher Regional Court.

Higher Regional Court	Native name and common abbreviation	ECLI court code	Federal state (Bundesland)				
Higher Regional Court	Native name and common abbreviation	ECLI court code	Federal state (Bundesland)	Higher Regional Court of Karlsruhe	Oberlandesgericht Karlsruhe (OLG Karlsruhe)	OLGKARL	Baden-Württemberg
Higher Regional Court of Stuttgart	Oberlandesgericht Stuttgart (OLG Stuttgart)	OLGSTUT	Baden-Württemberg				
Higher Regional Court of Bamberg	Oberlandesgericht Bamberg (OLG Bamberg)	OLGBAMB	Bavaria				
Higher Regional Court of Munich	Oberlandesgericht München (OLG München)	OLGMUEN	Bavaria				
Higher Regional Court of Nuremberg	Oberlandesgericht Nürnberg (OLG Nürnberg)	OLGNUER	Bavaria				
Kammergericht	Kammergericht (KG)	KG	Berlin				
Brandenburg Higher Regional Court	Brandenburgisches Oberlandesgericht (OLG Brandenburg)	OLGBB	Brandenburg				
Hanseatic Higher Regional Court in Bremen	Hanseatisches Oberlandesgericht in Bremen (HansOLG Bremen or OLG Bremen)	OLGHB	Bremen				
Hanseatic Higher Regional Court	Hanseatisches Oberlandesgericht (HansOLG or OLG Hamburg)	OLGHH	Hamburg				
Higher Regional Court of Frankfurt am Main	Oberlandesgericht Frankfurt am Main (OLG Frankfurt)	OLGHE	Hesse				
Higher Regional Court of Rostock	Oberlandesgericht Rostock (OLG Rostock)	OLGROST	Mecklenburg-Vorpommern				
Higher Regional Court of Braunschweig	Oberlandesgericht Braunschweig (OLG Braunschweig)	OLGBS	Lower Saxony				
Higher Regional Court of Celle	Oberlandesgericht Celle (OLG Celle)	OLGCE	Lower Saxony				
Higher Regional Court of Oldenburg	Oberlandesgericht Oldenburg (OLG Oldenburg)	OLGOL	Lower Saxony				
Higher Regional Court of Düsseldorf	Oberlandesgericht Düsseldorf (OLG Düsseldorf)	OLGD	North Rhine-Westphalia				
Higher Regional Court of Hamm	Oberlandesgericht Hamm (OLG Hamm)	OLGHAM	North Rhine-Westphalia				
Higher Regional Court of Cologne	Oberlandesgericht Köln (OLG Köln)	OLGK	North Rhine-Westphalia				
Higher Regional Court of Koblenz	Oberlandesgericht Kobelnz (OLG Koblenz)	OLGKOBL	Rhineland-Palatinate				
Palatine Higher Regional Court	Pfälzisches Oberlandesgericht Zweibrücken (OLG Zweibrücken)	POLGZWE	Rhineland-Palatinate				
Saarland Higher Regional Court	Saarländisches Oberlandesgericht (OLG Saarbrücken)	OLGSL	Saarland				
Higher Regional Court of Dresden	Oberlandesgericht Dresden (OLG Dresden)	OLGDRES	Saxony				
Higher Regional Court of Naumburg	Oberlandesgericht Naunburg (OLG Naunburg)	OLGNAUM	Saxony-Anhalt				
Schleswig-Holstein Higher Regional Court	Schleswig-Holsteinisches Oberlandesgericht (OLG Schleswig)	OLGSH	Schleswig-Holstein				
Thuringian Higher Regional Court	Thüringer Oberlandesgericht (OLG Jena)	OLGTH	Thuringia				
