= Higher Regional Court of Karlsruhe =

- Oberlandesgericht Karlsruhe
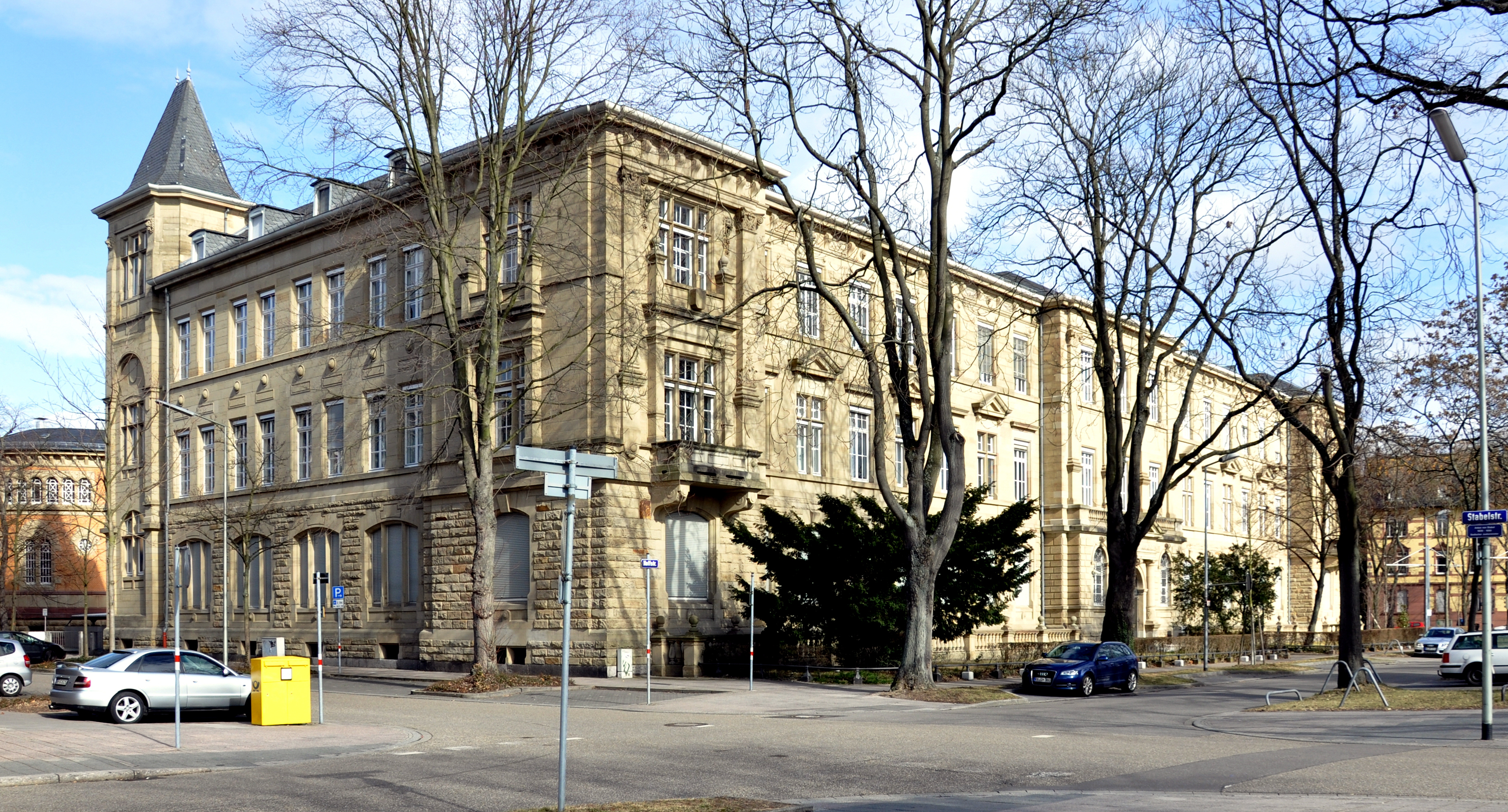
- 49°01′N 8°23′E
- Established: October 1, 1879
- Jurisdiction: Baden-Württemberg
- Location: Karlsruhe, Baden-Württemberg, Germany
- Coordinates: 49°01′N 8°23′E
- Authorised by: Gerichtsverfassungsgesetz
- Appeals to: Federal Court of Justice
- Appeals from: Baden-Baden, Freiburg, Heidelberg, Karlsruhe, Konstanz, Mannheim, Mosbach, Offenburg, Waldshut-Tiengen, Kehl, Mannheim, Mainz
- Number of positions: 102
- Language: German
- Website: oberlandesgericht-karlsruhe.justiz-bw.de

PräsOLG
- Currently: Jörg Müller
- Since: 2024

Division map
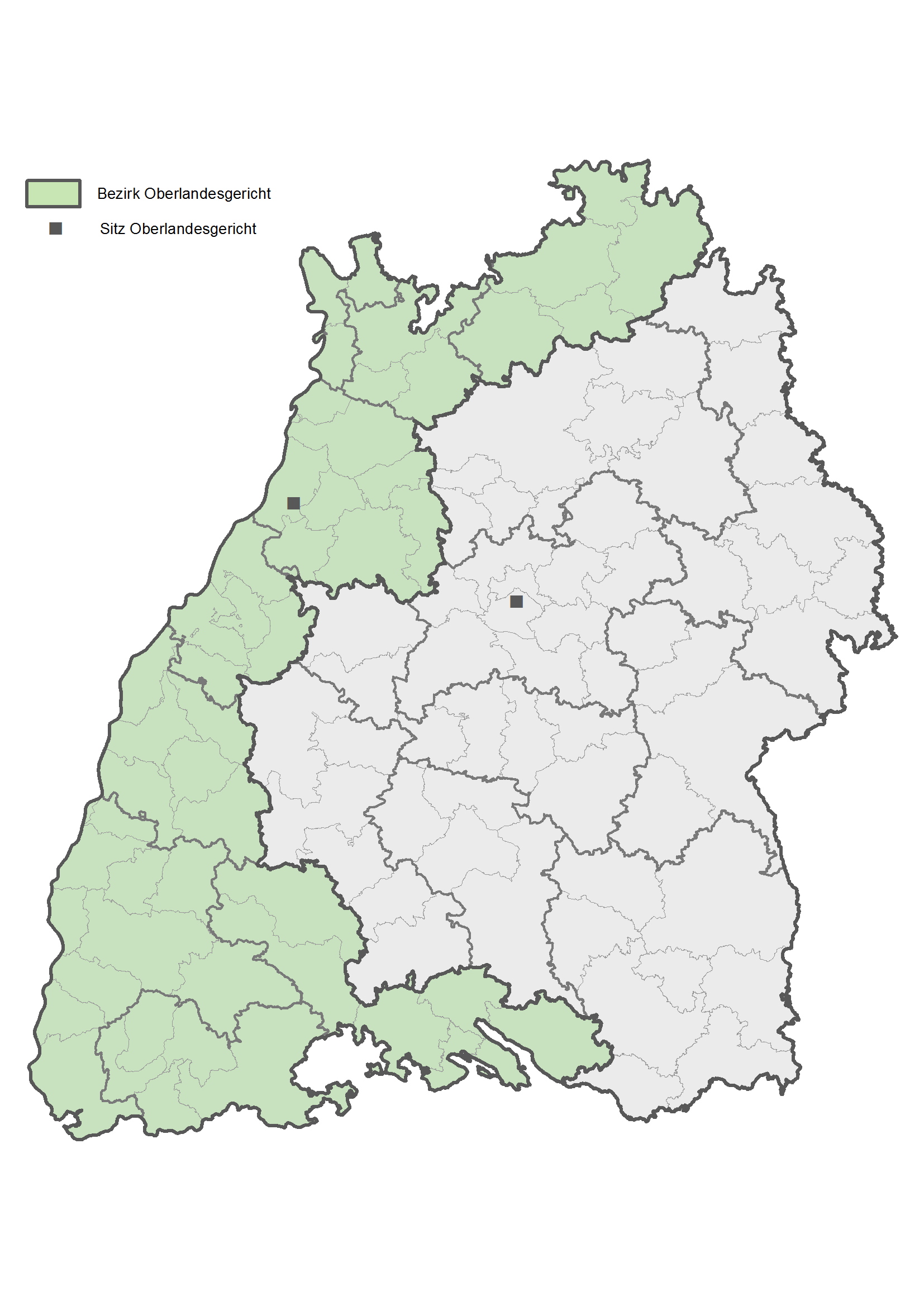
- Green served by OLG Karlsruhe, Gray served by OLG Stuttgart

The Higher Regional Court of Karlsruhe (German: Oberlandesgericht Karlsruhe; abbreviated: OLG Karlsruhe) is, alongside the Higher Regional Court of Stuttgart, one of the two Higher Regional Courts of Baden-Württemberg, Germany.

== History ==
=== Origins ===
On February 4, 1803, Margrave Charles Frederick had the highest court created, at that time still under the name Badisches Oberhofgericht, which began its service for the Margraviate of Baden on June 10, 1803. The seat of the Badisches Oberhofgericht was initially in the Bruchsal Palace, the previous residence of the Prince-Bishopric of Speyer, and from July 23, 1810 to 1879 in the Mannheim Palace.

The Badisches Oberhofgericht consisted of two senates, an Oberhofrichter (high court judge), a vice chancellor and several councillors. It had the Privilegium de non appellando, meaning it had the final say in legal matters. In civil law, the Badisches Oberhofgericht was responsible for the second and third instance of the court courts' judgments.

=== Moving to Karlsruhe and renaming ===
On October 1, 1879, the Oberlandesgericht Karlsruhe (Higher Regional Court of Karlsruhe) was founded, succeeding the previous Badisches Oberhofgericht in Mannheim. The Higher Regional Court was initially housed in the Linkenheimer Straße street in Karlsruhe together with the district court Landgericht Karlsruhe and the regional court Amtsgericht Karlsruhe. In 1902, it was given its own office building at Hoffstraße 10, where it is still based today. In terms of organization, originally it was divided into two civil senates and one criminal senate, each with five judges, a president, two senate presidents and 18 councilors. Seven Landgericht courts and 57 Amtgericht courts are subordinate to the Karlsruhe Higher Regional Court.

After World War II, Karlsruhe became a secondary seat of the Higher Regional Court of Stuttgart in the American occupation zone, while in the French occupation zone (South Baden) there was a separate Oberlandesgericht Freiburg (Higher Regional Court of Freiburg). After the founding of Baden-Württemberg in 1952, the Karlsruhe Higher Regional Court became fully functional again. Only external senates of the Higher Regional Court of Karlsruhe remained in Freiburg. The Higher Regional Court of Stuttgart became the second of the two Higher Regional Courts in Baden-Württemberg.

== Jurisdiction ==
In the case of appeals or complaints against judgments of local Amtsgericht courts, the case is heard again at a regional Landgericht court and then, if necessary, at the Federal Court of Justice. The Higher Regional Court only appears as an instance between the Landgericht and the Federal Court of Justice if the Landgericht court was the first instance and no Amtsgericht court was involved because the expected penalty or the amount in controversy exceeds a specific limit.

In the case of appeals against judgements of the family court, which is actually located at the local Amtsgericht court, these are not heard at the regional Landgericht court, but directly at the Higher Regional Court.

The Higher Regional Court is the first instance only in criminal law relating to state security agency matters. It is also involved when an action is taken against a negative decision by the public prosecutor's office in an enforcement procedure.
