= Higher Regional Court of Bamberg =

Coordinates: 49°53′31″N 10°53′49″E

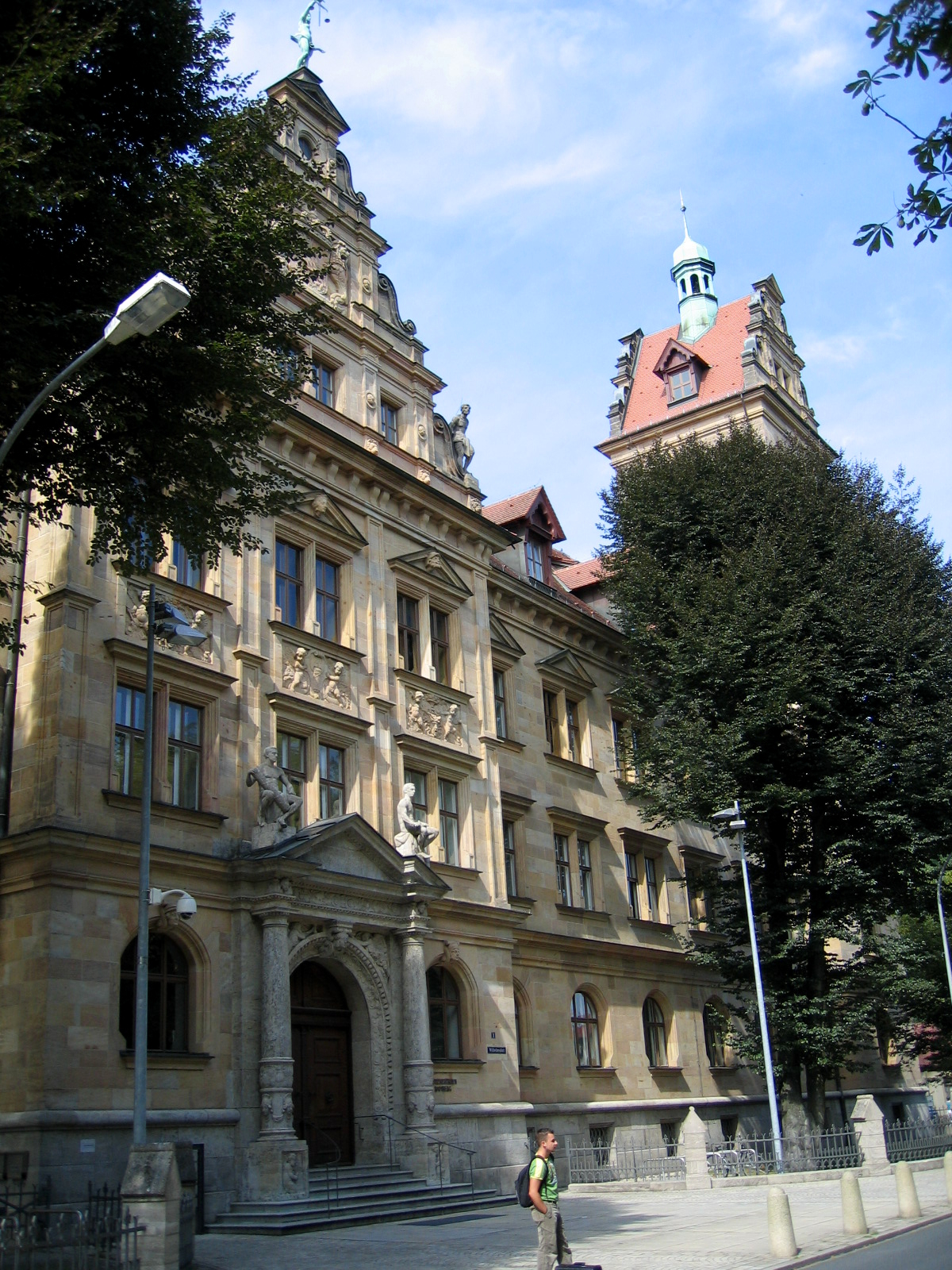
Courthouse

The Higher Regional Court of Bamberg is one of three Bavarian higher regional courts, alongside the Higher Regional Court of Munich and the Higher Regional Court of Nuremberg.

== History ==
In 1803, the Bamberg Court of Appeal was established in the Kingdom of Bavaria as an appeal court. The Organic Edict on the Judicial Constitution of July 24, 1808, Part III, converted it into a Bavarian Court of Appeal. The Courts of Appeal ruled in senates with five members each. In 1856, the Courts of Appeal became the appeal court for the decisions of the district courts. In 1873, the Courts of Appeal for Upper and Lower Franconia were combined in Bamberg. The Court of Appeal in Aschaffenburg was thus dissolved and its duties transferred to the Court in Bamberg.

Until 1875, the Court of Appeal in Bamberg had a senate (staffed by Protestant judges) for contentious marriage cases of Protestants and dissidents. In 1879, the Court of Appeal in Bamberg was converted into a higher regional court when the German Court Constitution Act came into force.

== Court seat and district ==
The Higher Regional Court (OLG) is based in Bamberg. The judicial district includes the administrative districts of Upper Franconia and Lower Franconia. 2,572 lawyers and in-house lawyers are admitted to practice in the district of the Higher Regional Court (as of January 1, 2023).

=== Superior and subordinate courts ===
The only court superior to the Bamberg Higher Regional Court is the Federal Court of Justice in Karlsruhe. Subordinate to the court are the regional courts in Aschaffenburg, Bamberg, Bayreuth, Coburg, Hof, Schweinfurt and Würzburg, with a total of 18 local courts located in their respective districts.

=== Courthouse ===
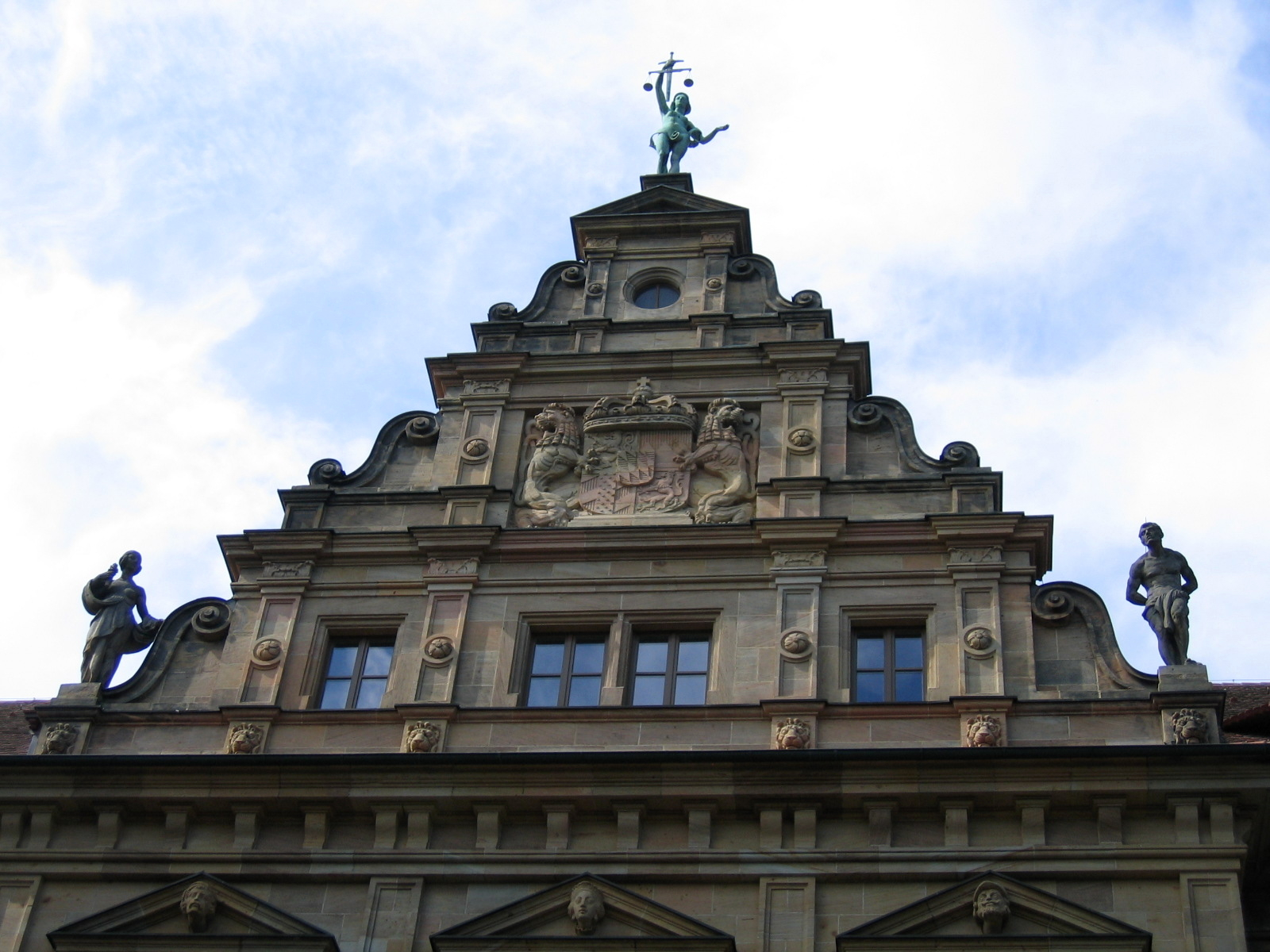
Gable of the courthouse with Justitia

The Bamberg Higher Regional Court is housed together with the Bamberg Regional Court in the courthouse on Wilhelmsplatz. The building was constructed specifically as a courthouse in 1900.

== Jurisdiction ==
The court carries out the tasks assigned to it under the Courts Constitution Act, which in particular include deciding on appeals in civil and criminal cases.

There are 13 Senates at the Bamberg Higher Regional Court:

- 12 civil senates (2 of which are also family senates, one is also a divorce senate, one for agricultural matters and one for building land matters)
- 1 criminal and fine senate

== List of presidents ==
- 1932–1933: Hans Aul
- 1933–1938: Albert Heuwieser
- 1938–1939: Vakant (Vertreter: Vizepräsident Otto Stammler)
- 1939–1944: Ernst Dürig
- 1945–1947: Lorenz Krapp
- 1947–1949: Thomas Dehler
- 1949–1950: Hermann Weinkauff
- 1950–1956: August Schäfer
- 1956–1962: Oskar Lechner
- 1963–1970: Franz Rehm
- 1970–1978: Johann Schütz
- 1978–1984: Franz Faber
- 1984–1994: Anton Kreuzer
- 1994–2002: Reinhard Böttcher
- 2002–2009: Michael Meisenberg
- 2009–2013: Peter Werndl
- 2013–2020: Clemens Lückemann
- 2020–2023: Lothar Schmitt
- Since 2023: Karin Angerer

== See also ==
- Liste deutscher Gerichte
