= Outright Monetary Transactions case =

- Court: European Court of Justice
- Decided: 14 January 2014
- Citations: BVerfGE 134, 366; 2 BvR 2728/13

Keywords
- Preliminary ruling

Outright Monetary Transactions case (2014) BVerfGE 134, 366 is an EU law case, concerning preliminary references to the Court of Justice of the European Union.

== Facts ==
In September 2012, the European Central Bank Governing Council adopted a decision on Technical Features of Outright Monetary Transactions (OMT). This authorised emergency and confidential purchases of unlimited government bonds of member states in financial difficulty, if they could not obtain sustainable interest rates in open financial markets. It did so under conditions that the member state would pursue reform under the European Financial Stability Forum or the European Stability Mechanism. The decision was authority, and was not yet in effect. But the mere publication of the ECB’s intention was enough to calm financial markets. A challenge was brought in Germany as to whether this was compatible with the Treaty on the Functioning of the European Union.

== Judgment ==
The German Constitutional Court made a preliminary reference, asking whether the OMT decision was compatible with TFEU articles 119 and 127, on the ECB’s mandate, and TFEU article 123 which prohibits monetary financing of member state budgets. The purchase of government bonds was an economic not a monetary measure because (1) its objective was to neutralise spreads of government bonds (2) it selectively purchased bonds of member states, while monetary policy was meant to be uniform (3) it was related to financial rescue of member states, so was functionally equivalent. OMT was intended to circumvent art 123(1), which prohibits providing overdraft facilities. Under the Honeywell standard, the OMT decision would manifestly exceed EU competence, bringing about a structural shift in the balance of competences, unless interpreted restrictively.

According to the Court, if the OMT decision is to qualify as an independent act of economic policy it violates the distribution of powers. It is structurally significant because it is equivalent to financial assistance without safeguards. Rescue programmes, owing to ‘their significant financial scope and general political implications, belong to the core aspects of the Member States’ economic policy responsibilities.’ Without parliamentary approval, the OMT did away with national democratic process. OMT was structurally significant by redistributing between budgets of member state taxpayers, and so was fiscal redistribution contrary to TFEU art 125. The prohibition of monetary financing of the budget is one of the fundamental rules that guarantee the design of the monetary union as a ‘community of stability’ and safeguards the overall budgetary responsibility of the German Bundestag. The OMT could be rescued, by restrictive interpretation, by (1) excluding any acceptance of a debt cut (2) not permitting purchase of an unlimited amount of bonds (3) avoiding interference with price formation on the market.

German participation in ESM had to be cleared by the Bundestag, but the ECB intervention was not subject to parliamentary approval.

The reference was made by a majority of four to two.

Judge Lübbe-Wolffe and Judge Gerhardt (the two most senior judges) dissented.

== Subsequent developments ==
The European Court of Justice has largely overruled the case putting "the German Constitutional Court in a tough position".

== See also ==
- European Union law
