= Palatine Higher Regional Court =

German Higher Regional Court

- Pfälzisches Oberlandesgericht Zweibrücken
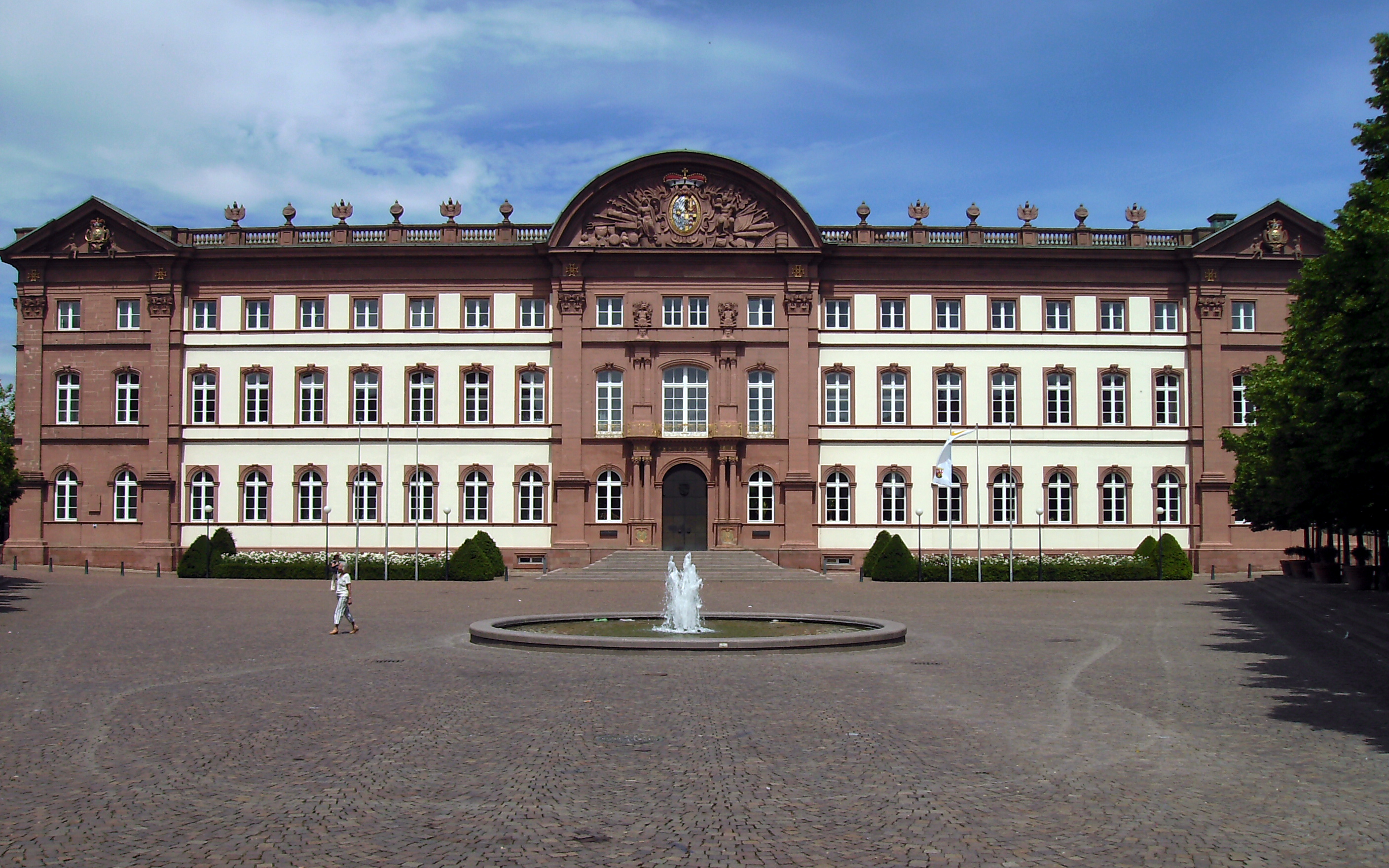
- Zweibrücken Castle, seat of the Palatine Higher Regional Court (2007)
- 49.2489°N 7.3639°E
- Jurisdiction: Berlin, Germany
- Location: Zweibrücken Castle, Zweibrücken, Rhineland-Palatinate
- Coordinates: 49.2489°N 7.3639°E
- Authorised by: Gerichtsverfassungsgesetz
- Website: olgzw.justiz.rlp.de/de/startseite/

President
- Currently: Bernhard Thurn

The Palatine Higher Regional Court in Zweibrücken (Pfälzisches Oberlandesgericht Zweibrücken) is one of two Higher Regional Courts in the German state of Rhineland-Palatinate, along with the Higher Regional Court in Koblenz.

== History ==
The Palatine Higher Regional Court is one of the oldest of its kind in Germany. It was established in 1816 when King Maximilian I of Bavaria – also the last Duke of Zweibrücken in personal union – ordered the relocation of the Bavarian court of appeal, which had been established in Kaiserslautern in July 1815.

The origins of the Palatine Court of Appeal are closely linked to the administrative reorganisation of the area west of the river Rhine following the fall of Napoleon. In 1815, after the end of French rulership, the royal Austrian and Bavarian regional administration had established a court of appeal in Kaiserslautern for this area of Germany. As a result of the Congress of Vienna, parts of the western shore of the Rhine – corresponding to today's Palatinate and the Saar-Pfalz district of the state of Saarland – had been taken over by Bavaria. In 1816 the King of Bavaria, Maximilian I – also the last Duke of Zweibrücken, from 1795 to 1825 – ordered the relocation of the royal court of appeal from Kaiserslautern to Zweibrücken, to commence operations from 1 August onwards. The opening ceremony was held on 16 October 1816. The city to which the Bavarian king had felt connected since childhood was now the seat of the highest-ranking court in the Palatinate – probably to act as a balance to Speyer, where the government of the Rhineland was based.

The law practiced by the court of appeal did not change for some time after the end of the Napoleonic era. The major achievements of the French Revolution – separation of powers, legal equality of all citizens, public viewing and the principle of oral presentation during court proceedings, as well as jury involvement – endured. French law was held in high regard. These liberal achievements, including freedom of the press, were very important to the population. As a result, these modern laws were also maintained on the western shores of the Rhine under Bavarian rule. Only gradually, over a lengthy period of time, did French law become less significant - such as with the Reichsjustizgesetze coming into force on 1 October 1879, and the introduction of the German Civil Code on 1 January 1900. The German law which succeeded it was in many aspects influenced by the values of French law.

During the Restauration and Vormärz periods, the Palatinate became a stronghold of the liberal-democratic movement which reached its zenith in 1832 with the “Hambacher Fest”. Philipp Siebenpfeiffer and Johann Wirth, both journalists, had transformed Zweibrücken and Homburg into hotspots of fighting for the new rights of freedom through their establishment of the “Deutscher Preß- und Vaterlandsverein” (German Press and Fatherland Union) and publication of the “Boten aus dem Westen” (Messages from the West) and “Deutsche Tribüne” (German Tribune). In April 1832 they issued a general invitation to a large-scale but peaceable festival at Hambach Castle – in the words of Wirth a “national festival for the German people, a festival to shake off all violence within and without”. Their close circle included numerous advocates and judges from the Zweibrücken court of appeal, such as Schüler, Geib, Savoye, Cullmann and Hoffmann. On 27 May 1832, twenty to thirty thousand people assembled at Hambach Castle at what was the largest ever mass event in Germany before 1848. The Bavarian government's reaction was immediate and drastic. Siebenpfeiffer and Wirth were arrested and, among others, put on trial – by jury however – before the court of appeal on a charge of high treason. To prevent further unrest the “assize trial” was transferred from Zweibrücken to Landau. The trial ended with an acquittal from the charge of high treason – however Siebenpfeiffer and Wirth were subsequently put on trial before a police court for affronting authorities.

The introduction of the Reichsjustizgesetze on 1 October 1879 saw the court of appeal receive the appellation of “Higher Regional Court”. The “Bezirksgerichte” (district courts) associated with it, in Frankenthal, Kaiserslautern, Landau and Zweibrücken, became “Landgerichte” (county courts). From 1938 the Higher Regional Court assumed responsibility for the district of the Saarbrücken county court; in 1940 it added the district of the Metz county court to its jurisdiction, located in the French region of Lothringia (then under occupation by the Third Reich).

The chaos of war forced the Higher Regional Court to move twice – first to Ludwigshafen and then to Kirchheimbolanden, where its operations were temporarily put to an end in March 1945 with the entry of American troops into the town. In 1946 it resumed operations; however due to the destruction of Zweibrücken Castle during the war its seat was moved to Neustadt an der Weinstraße.

On 1 January 1965 the Higher Regional Court was moved back to the reconstructed Zweibrücken Castle. In recognition of its noteworthy past, the court was officially designated the “Pfälzisches Oberlandesgericht Zweibrücken” (Palatine Higher Regional Court, Zweibrücken) in 1990.

== Presidents of the Higher Regional Court until 1933 ==
- Johann Andreas Georg Friedrich von Rebmann (1815-1824)
- Johann Baptist von Birnbaum (1824-1832)
- Christian von Koch (1832-1846)
- Heinrich von Schnellenbühl (1846-1852)
- Peter E. von Korbach (1852-1871)
- Ludwig von Weis (1871-1879)
- Friedrich von Kiefer (1879-1889)
- Ludwig von Zoeller (1889-1896)
- Jakob von Fitting (1896-1898)
- Heinrich von Hessert (1898-1903)
- Karl von Wilhelm (1903-1908)
- Adolf von Lippmann (1908-1914)
- Adolf von Ziegler (1914-1919)
- Alexander Bilabel (1919-1927)
- Friedrich Jakob Becker (1927-1933)

== Court seat/district ==
The Palatine Higher Regional Court has its seat in Zweibrücken, in Zweibrücken Castle. The area covered by its jurisdiction includes 1.5 million people. As of 1 January 2014, there are 1,459 approved lawyers living in this area.

== Superior and subordinate courts ==
The Palatine Higher Regional Court is subordinate only to the Federal Court of Justice (Bundesgerichtshof). Subordinate to the Higher Regional Court itself are the county courts in Frankenthal (Palatinate), Kaiserslautern, Landau in der Pfalz and Zweibrücken, along with their respective local courts.

== Jurisdiction ==
The federal state of Rhineland-Palatinate has used the opportunity to concentrate responsibilities for specific aspects of “Freiwilligen Gerichtsbarkeit” (voluntary jurisdiction) on its Higher Regional Court; all such matters have been assigned to the Higher Regional Court.

Furthermore, the Rhineland-Palatinate's disciplinary tribunal for judges also takes place at the Higher Regional Court in Zweibrücken.

== Administrators ==
- Willi Kestel, President of the Palatine Higher Regional Court
- Jörg Hoffmann, Vice-President of the Palatine Higher Regional Court

== Managing directors ==
- Matthias Lutz, Justizamtsrat

== See also ==
- Judiciary of Germany
