= Miles v European Schools =

2011 European Court of Justice case

- Court: European Court of Justice
- Citations: (2011) C-196/09; [2011] 3 CMLR 25

Keywords
- Preliminary ruling

Miles v European Schools (2011) C-196/09 is an EU law case, concerning preliminary references to the Court of Justice of the European Union.

== Facts ==
The Complaints Board of European Schools (set up under an international agreement between different member states and the EU, the European Schools Convention) sought to make a preliminary reference to the Court of Justice, and the question was whether it could do so under TFEU article 267.

== Judgment ==
The Court of Justice, Grand Chamber held that the Complaints Board of European Schools was a court, but not of a member state. This was different from the Benelux Court.

== See also ==
- European Union law
