= Tolksdorf =

Tolksdorf may refer to:

- the Polish village of Tołkiny
- Birgitta Tolksdorf (born 1947), German-American actress
- Klaus Tolksdorf (born 1948), German Federal Judge
