= Vaassen v Beambtenfonds Mijnbedrijf =

- Court: European Court of Justice
- Citation: (1966) Case 61/65

Keywords
- Preliminary ruling

Vaassen v Beambtenfonds Mijnbedrijf (1966) Case 61/65 is an EU law case, concerning preliminary references to the Court of Justice of the European Union.

== Facts ==
The Netherlands had a scheidsgerecht, a mining worker pension arbitration tribunal. It was set up under statute. Rule changes had to be approved by the minister. It sought to make a preliminary reference, and the question was whether it was entitled to do so as a court under (what is now) TFEU article 267.

Advocate General Gand said the court tribunal was ‘a judicial body duly representing the power of the state, and settling as a matter of law disputes concerning the application of the insurance scheme.’

== Judgment ==
The Court of Justice held the scheidsgerecht was a court under TFEU article 267 (then TEEC art 177).

== See also ==
- European Union law
