= Criminal proceedings against Kenny Roland Lyckeskog =

Kenny Roland Lyckeskog
- Court: European Court of Justice
- Citation: (2002) C-99/00

Keywords
- Preliminary ruling

Criminal proceedings against Kenny Roland Lyckeskog (2002) C-99/00 is an EU law case, concerning preliminary references to the Court of Justice of the European Union.

== Facts ==
Under Swedish law, the court of appeal, hovrätt cannot send appeals to the supreme court, because the Högsta domstol must allow it to be admitted. The question was whether it had to make a reference to the Court of Justice.

== Judgment ==
The Court of Justice held a national court whose decisions can only be appealed if the supreme court declares it admissible is not a court against whose decision there is no judicial remedy. However, if a question of interpretation arises, the Högsta domstol is under an obligation under art 234(3) to make a reference, either when examining admissibility or later.

== See also ==
- European Union law
