= Gerd Pfeiffer =

German jurist (1919–2007)

4th President of the Federal Court of Justice
- In office 31 December 1987 – 1 October 1977
- Preceded by: Robert Fischer
- Succeeded by: Walter Odersky

Personal details
- Born: 22 December 1919 Striegau, Free State of Prussia, Weimar Germany
- Died: 1 February 2007 (aged 87) Karlsruhe, Baden-Württemberg, Germany

Military service
- Allegiance: Nazi Germany
- Branch/service: Heer
- Years of service: 1937; 1939–1945
- Battles/wars: World War II

Gerd Pfeiffer (22 December 1919 – 1 February 2007) was a German jurist who served as the fourth President of the Federal Court of Justice of West Germany from 1977 to 1987.

== Biography ==
In March 1937, Pfeiffer finished his Abitur and was recruited into the Reich Labour Service (German: Reichsarbeitsdienst, abbr. RAD) in Breslau. From 1937 onwards he completed his mandatory service in the Wehrmacht. After the start of World War II in 1939, he served in the Heer until 1945. He was wounded five times. After the war ended, he studied law at the University of Erlangen-Nuremberg from 1945 to 1948. In 1948, he was promoted to Dr. iur. by the university faculty. After passing the second Staatsexamen in 1951, he entered into judicial service in Bavaria. Following that, he served as a scientific employee at the Federal Constitutional Court (German: Bundesverfassungsgericht, abbr. BVG) from 1952 to 1958, being promoted to judge at the Landgericht München I and later at the Supreme District Court in Munich.

On 7 April 1966, Pfeiffer was appointed Federal Judge. He was delegated the I. Punitive Senate of the Federal Court of Justice, becoming president of that senate on 5 March 1970. On 3 November 1976, he was appointed the Vice President of the Federal Court of Justice, and less than a year later, on 1 October 1977, he was appointed the court's President, succeeding Robert Fischer. Additionally, he became the chairman of the Cartel Senate of the court.

In 1979, he was named the speaker of a celebration for the centenary of the Reich Court (German: Reichsgericht), where he gained notoriety for successfully defending the conservative tradition of the court before 1933, while at the same time denouncing Nazi excesses committed through the judicial system and describing the changes to the legal system since 1945.

For his judicial competency and determination, he became well-respected as an expert in criminal law. Using his abilities as the head of the Ethics Commission of Freiburg, as well as the chairman of the scientific council of the exposition "Justice and National Socialism" (German: Justiz und Nationalsozialismus) in 1989. He opposed the toughening-up of existing criminal law in a way he believed to be disproportionate. Additionally, he opposed the policy on turn state's evidence pursued by the then-Federal Minister of the Interior Friedrich Zimmermann. During his tenure, Pfeiffer published, among other things, the Karlsruhe Commentary to the Code of Criminal Procedure (German: Karlsruher Kommentar zur Strafprozeßordnung).

He retired on 31 December 1987 from his position as President of the Federal Court of Justice. He was succeeded by Walter Odersky. He was the first member of the Social Democratic Party of Germany (SPD) to become president of that court.

From 1988 to 1993, he was the Chairman of the Supportive Association for the Legal History Museum (German: Trägervereins für das Rechtshistorische Museum) in Karlsruhe.

== Honours ==
- Federal Cross of Merit
- Bavarian Cross of Merit
- Grand Decoration of Honour in Gold with Sash of Austria
- Grand Cross of the Order of Merit of the Italian Republic
- Badge of Honour of the German Advocacy
- Iron Cross

== Bibliography ==
- Klaus Tiedemann, Otto-Friedrich Freiherr von Gamm, Peter Raisch: Strafrecht, Unternehmensrecht, Anwaltsrecht. Festschrift für Gerd Pfeiffer. Zum Abschied aus dem Amt als Präsident des Bundesgerichtshofes. Heymann, Köln u. a. 1988, ISBN 3-452-20938-5.
- Thomas Fischer: Gerd Pfeiffer † 1. Februar 2007. Nachruf. In: Journal der Juristischen Zeitgeschichte. 1. Jahrgang, Heft 3, 2007, ISSN 1863-9984, S. 101–103.
