= Hereditary Grand Ducal Palace =

Coordinates: 49°0′22″N 8°23′47″E

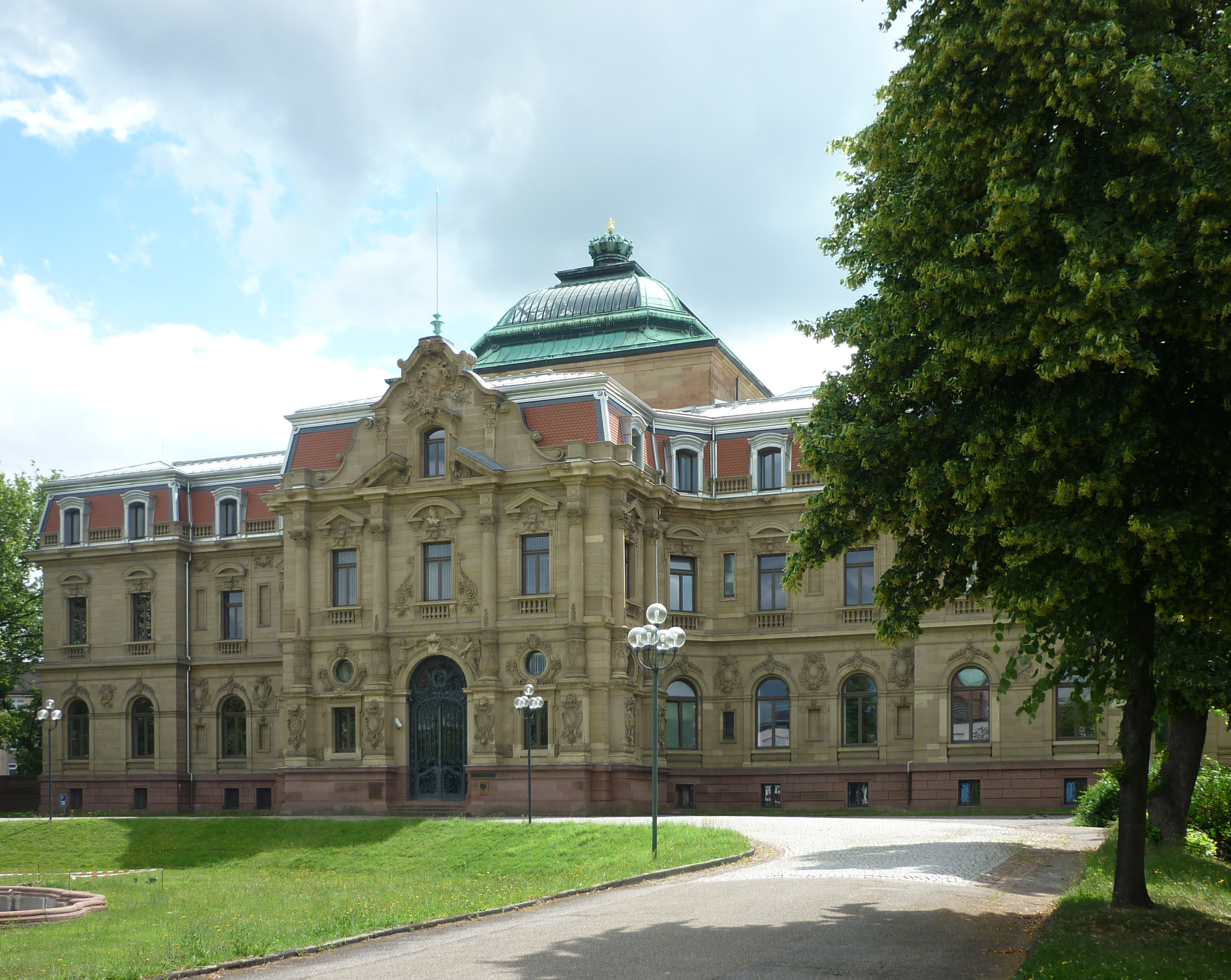
Hereditary Grand Ducal Palace after restoration of the historic gambrel roof, 2012

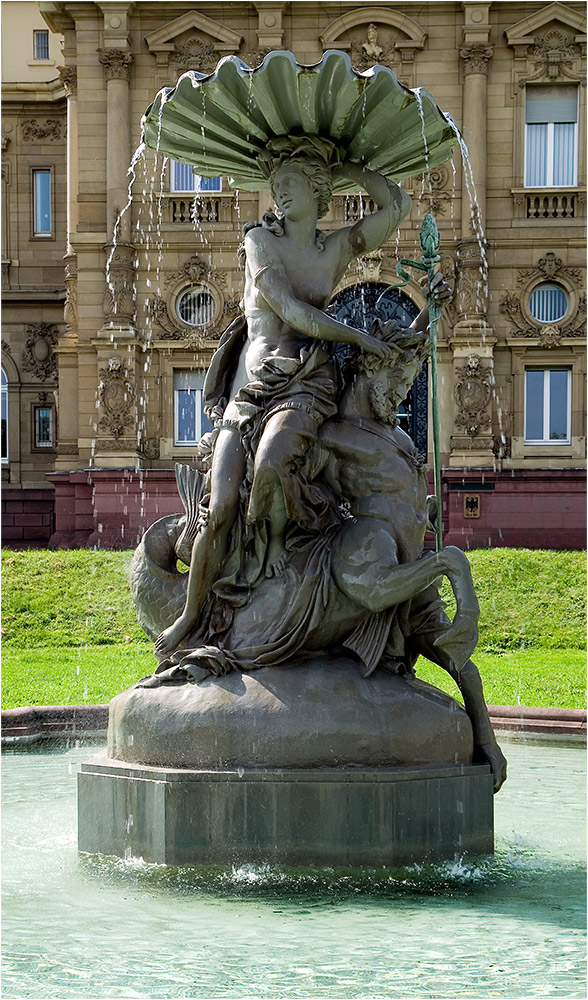
Galatea Fountain

The Hereditary Grand Ducal Palace (German: Erbgroßherzogliches Palais) in Karlsruhe on Kriegsstraße has been the seat of the Federal Court of Justice since 1950.

== History ==
On the site of what later became the Hereditary Grand Ducal Palace, a Classicist garden palace was built in 1817 by Friedrich Weinbrenner. It served as the widow's residence of Grand Duchess Sophie and later as the residence of Grand Duke Frederick I of Baden until he took office in 1852. This included a gardener's house, which is now used by the Federal Court of Justice as the so-called Weinbrenner building. After the demolition of the rest of the palace complex the Hereditary Grand Ducal Palace was built from 1891 to 1897 according to plans by Josef Durm in the style of Baroque Revival architecture for the then Hereditary Grand Duke, later Grand Duke Frederick II of Baden (1857-1928) and his wife Hilda of Nassau (1864-1952). When Frederick succeeded his father to the throne in 1907, he and his wife both continued living there.

During the Second World War, the top floor and the roof domes of the building were destroyed. In 1950, the Palais was assigned to the Federal Court of Justice and the Federal Public Prosecutor's Office. It was extended at the end of the 1990s. The historic gambrel roof was reconstructed in 2012.

On the second floor of the building there is a marble memorial plaque from 1957, commemorating 34 judges and lawyers from the Leipzig Reichsgericht and Reichsanwaltschaft, who died in Soviet captivity in Germany after the end of Nazi rule in 1945 and 1946. For the first twenty years, the plaque had an altar-like porch, decorated with flowers and a book of condolences. A plaquette was added in 2018 and an information sign in 2021, which references the unjust National Socialist system in which these lawyers participated, 23 of whom were members of the NSDAP. A stele was also erected on the first floor of the palace as a memorial to the victims of Nazi justice.

== Garden ==
The property currently in use covers an area of around four hectares, embedded in a parklike outdoor area. The gardens have been subject to constant change over the last 140 years, for example the extensions to the Federal Court of Justice.

The main features on the north side of the palace were designed and realized in 1817 by Friedrich Weinbrenner, the then Grand Ducal Chief Building Director of Baden, in connection with the planning of a garden palace. The palace was built on an artificial hill.

The garden on the south side of the palace (the side facing Kriegsstraße) was redesigned at the end of the 19th century as part of the extension of the original garden palace by Josef Durm, then head of the building department. One of the centerpieces was a cascade leading down six steps from a terrace and ending in a round basin with a fountain. With the exception of the terrace, which was completely renovated in 2006, the cascade fell victim to the car-friendly expansion of Kriegsstraße and Karlstor in 1970. The Galatea Fountain by Karl Friedrich Moest, which exists today, was not installed at the Federal Court of Justice until 1954.

As long as the office of the Public Prosecutor General at the Federal Court of Justice was also housed on the Herrenstraße site, large parts of the garden had to be dismantled and used as parking spaces due to a lack of other alternatives. With the relocation of the Federal Public Prosecutor's Office to the newly constructed building in Brauerstraße and the expansion of the Federal Court of Justice in 2003, an originally planned underground car park could not be realized for financial reasons. Nevertheless, the garden was given back many elements of its original character, in particular the wide lawns and the old trees.

Despite the relocation of the Attorney General's Office, the park has not yet been made accessible to the public due to the tightened security situation since 2001.

== See also ==
- List of castles in Baden-Württemberg

== Literature ==
- Johannes Wilhelm: 'Ein Sonderfall energetischer Sanierung. Die Wiederherstellung des Daches des Erbgroßherzoglichen Palais in Karlsruhe. In: Denkmalpflege in Baden-Württemberg, 41st vol. 2012, issue 4, p. 255 f. (PDF)
- Erbgroßherzogliches Palais – Page of the Federal Court of Justice on architecture and history
