= Zweibrücken Castle =

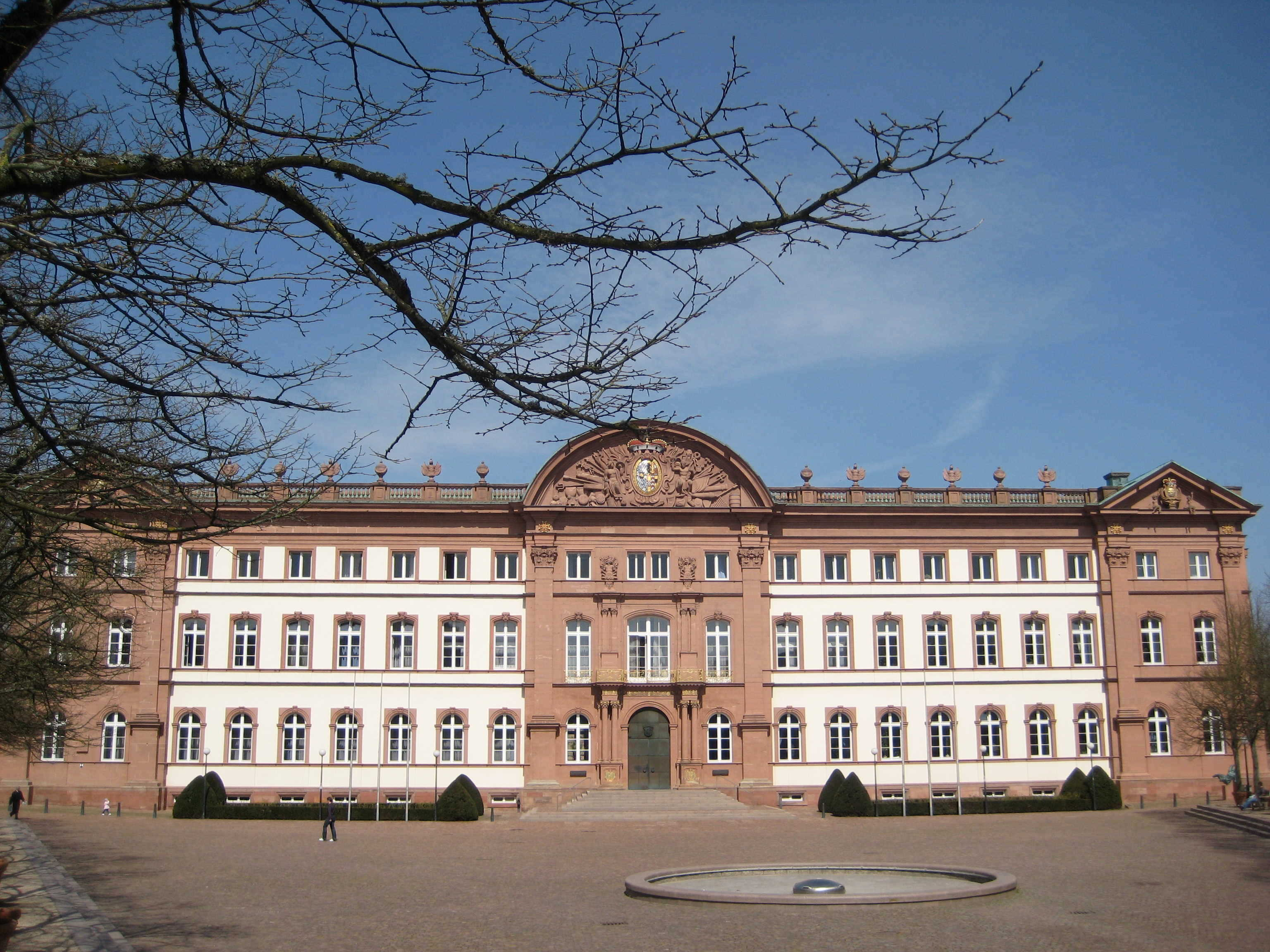
- Interactive map of the Zweibrücken Castle area

General information
- Type: Former ducal palace Law courts
- Architectural style: Late Baroque
- Location: Zweibrücken, Germany
- Coordinates: 49°14′57″N 7°21′51″E
- Elevation: c. 300 metres (980 ft)
- Construction started: 1720
- Construction stopped: 1725

Height
- Height: 25 m (82 ft)

Technical details
- Material: Red and yellow sandstone
- Floor area: 84 m × 23 m (276 ft × 75 ft)

Design and construction
- Architect: Jonas Erikson Sundahl

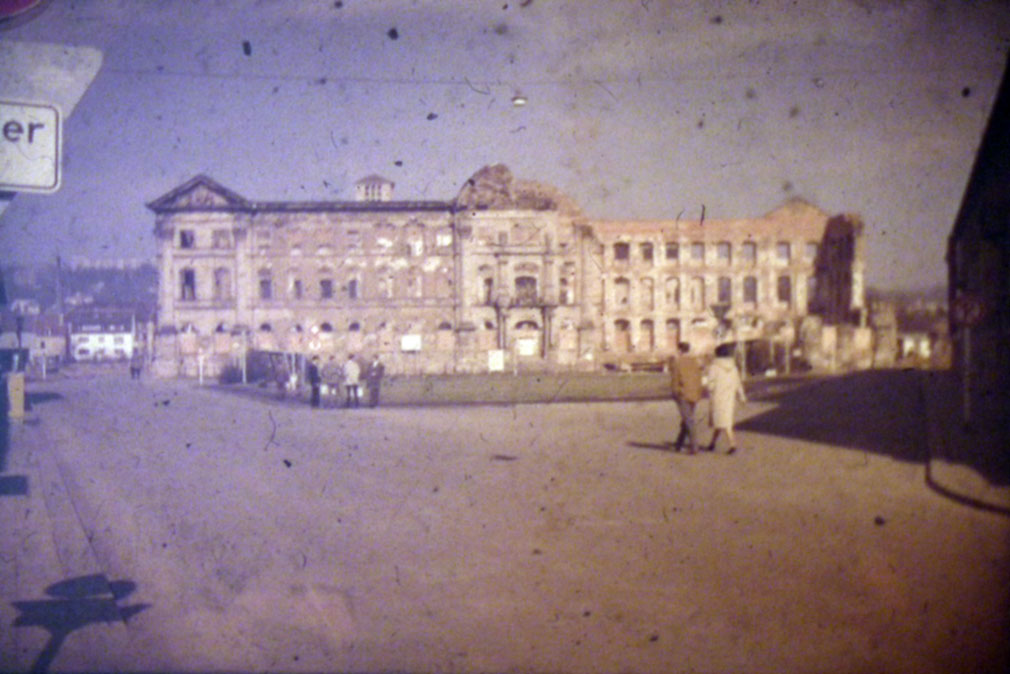
Zweibrücken Castle before reconstruction in 1962.

Zweibrücken Castle (German: Schloss Zweibrücken) is a building in the town of Zweibrücken, Rheinland-Pfalz, Germany. It was built as a ducal palace in 1720–1725. It is the largest and most magnificent secular (i.e. non-religious) building in the Palatinate. It is now the seat of the Palatine Higher Regional Court, and of the Zweibrücken law courts.

== History ==
The earliest recorded building near the site was a fortress (German: Burg Zweibrücken). It was built in the 12th century by the Counts of Zweibrücken; the town was on an important trade route. It sat on the eastern side of an open triangular area, which still exists today: the Schlossplatz (which translates into English as "Castle Square", whatever its shape might be).

In 1444, a junior (cadet) branch of the House of Wittelsbach was granted the title of Duke of a new state: Palatine Zweibrücken, with its seat in Zweibrücken. In the 16th and 17th centuries, the ducal family modernised and enlarged their dwelling-place. In 1585, they constructed a palace (known as "the long building by the water", German: der lange Bau am Wasser) on the northern side of the Schlossplatz, complete with water-mill and library.

In 1677, the ancient and the newer buildings were badly damaged during the Franco-Dutch War (1672–1678). In the early 18th century, Gustav, Duke of Zweibrücken ordered the construction of a new residence appropriate for his rank and status. The architect was Jonas Erikson Sundahl, whose design was in the modern Late Baroque style - for show and comfort, and not for defence. In 1720–25, this palace was built on the northern side of the Schlossplatz. The site was marshy, so preliminary work involved driving very many oak piles into the ground to provide a solid foundation. That building has been twice destroyed and twice rebuilt; its second reconstruction is the building which exists today.

Christian IV, Duke of Zweibrücken 1735–1775, entertained notable creative artists at his palace, including the leading operatic composer Christoph Willibald von Gluck. Christian's nephew Maximilian (1756–1825) spent some of his childhood at the palace.

On 3 May 1793, during the War of the First Coalition, Zweibrücken was overrun and sacked by French troops. The building was badly damaged.

In 1817, Maximilian, in 1795–99 merely Duke of Zweibrücken but by now King Maximilian I of Bavaria, gave the ruined building to the Catholic community of the town, with the command to convert it into a church. The central part of the building was walled off from its wings, and was roofed with slate. On 28 May 1820, it was consecrated as the Maximilianskirche by Johann Jakob Humann, Vicar Apostolic of both Speyer and Mainz. A bell tower was added later. The east wing was turned into a residence for the clergy. The west wing became a royal residence, and later the seat of the Royal Court of Appeals of the Palatinate. In 1867, the Maximilianskirche was deconsecrated and the whole building turned over to the administration of justice. The bell tower was taken down.

On 14 March 1945, in the final stages of World War II, Zweibrücken was the target of an Allied bombing raid. The building was gutted, and only its outer walls left standing.

By great good fortune, a copy of Sundahl's original plans was discovered in Nancy, France. In 1962-1964, the building was reconstructed from those plans, using red sandstone from the northern Palatinate and yellow sandstone from Lorraine. In 1965, the restored building was returned into use as the seat of the Palatine Higher Regional Court and of the Zweibrücken law courts.

== Gallery ==
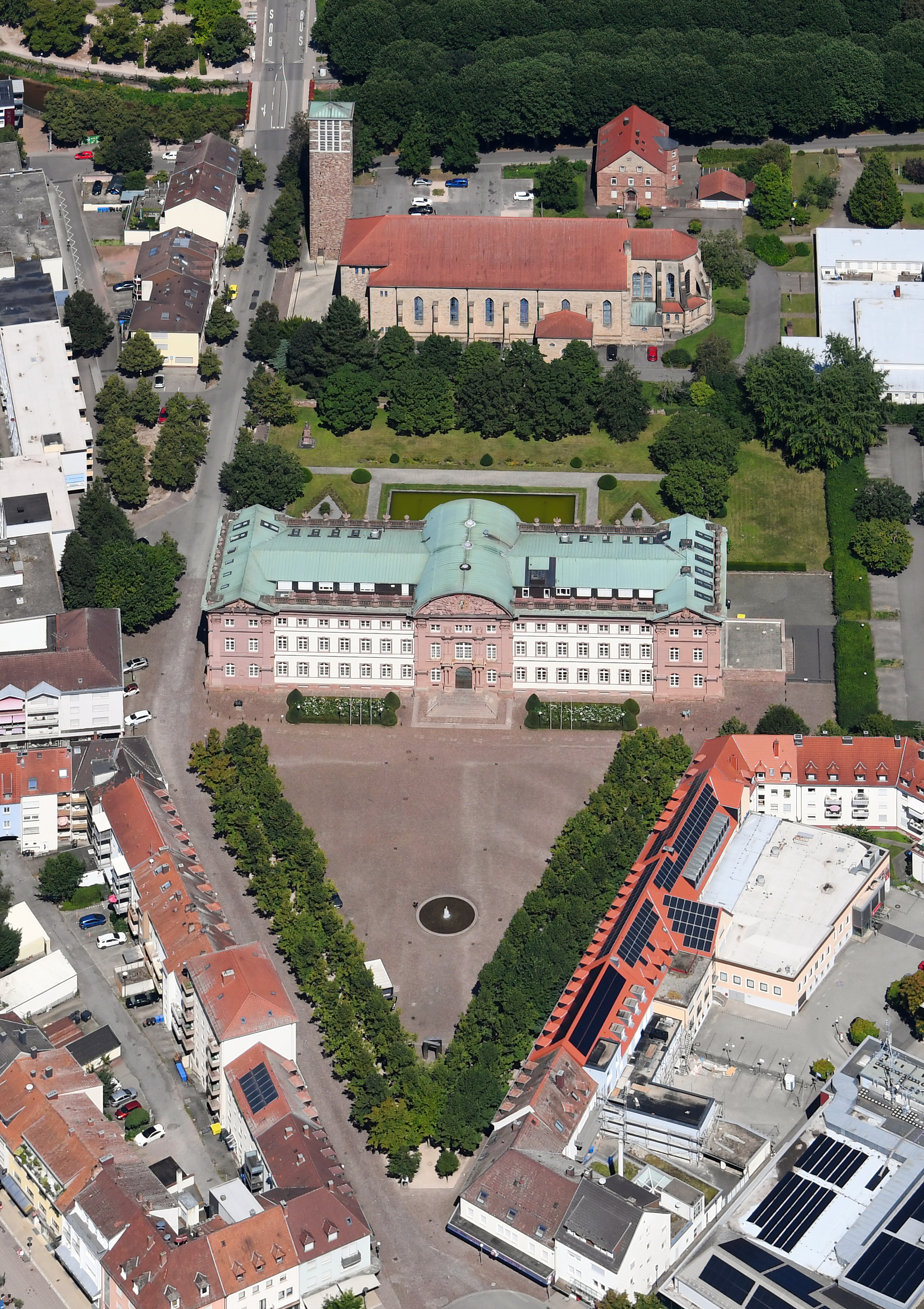
Aerial view

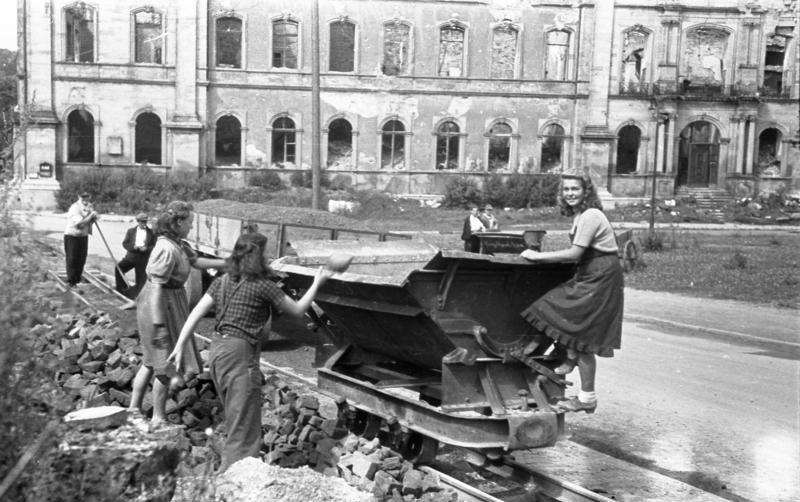
The building in ruins, c. 1946-47

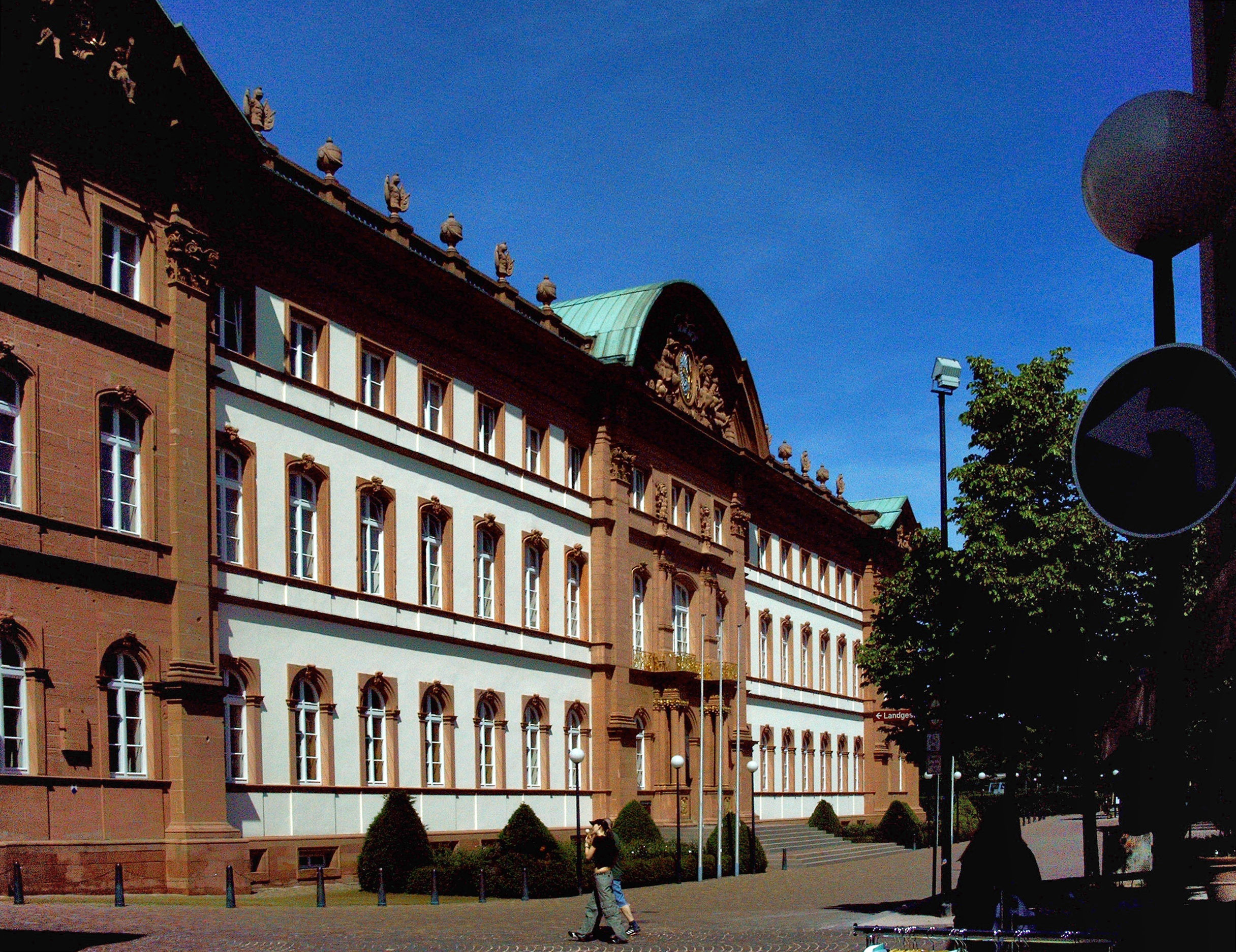
A view from the south-west

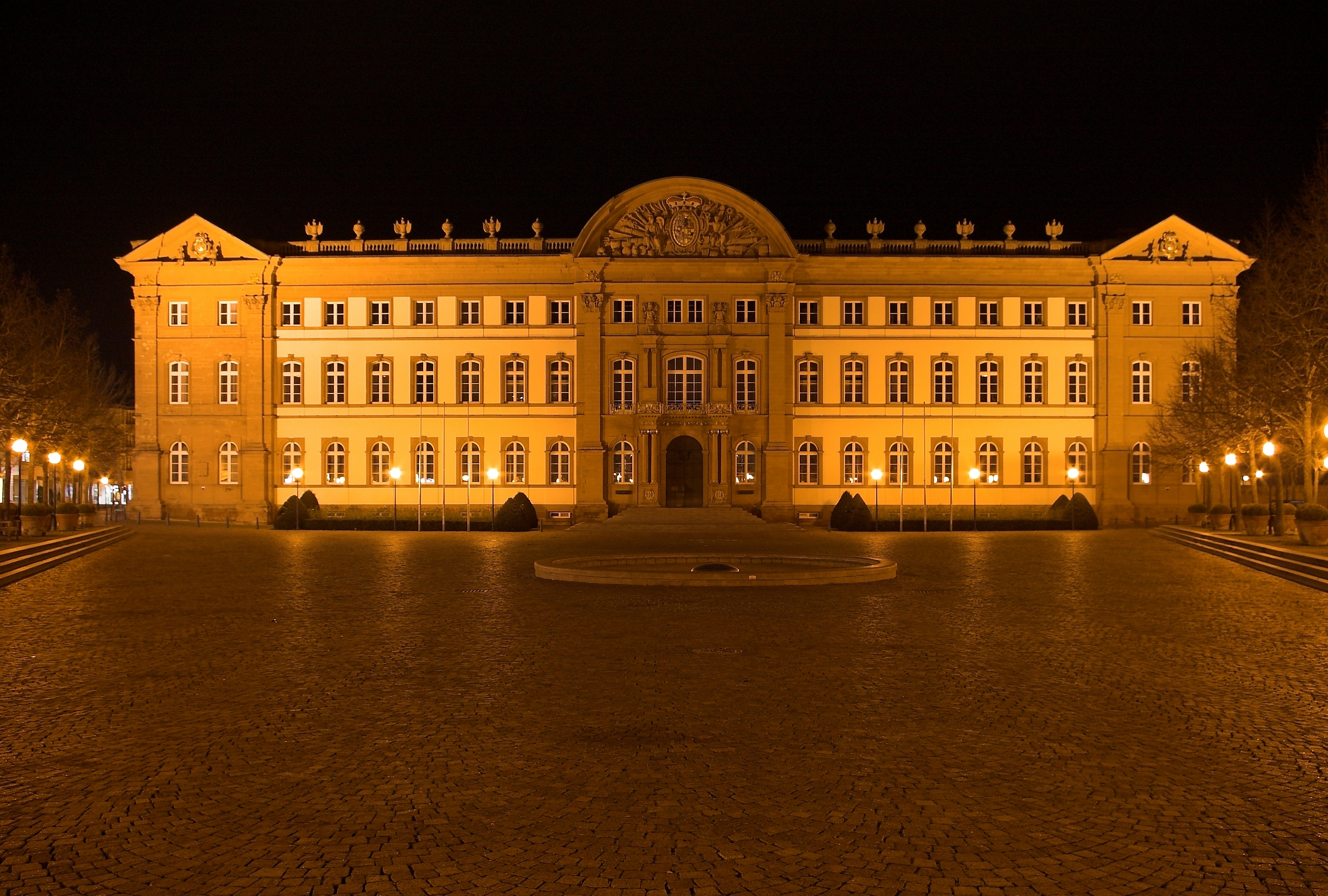
The building by night

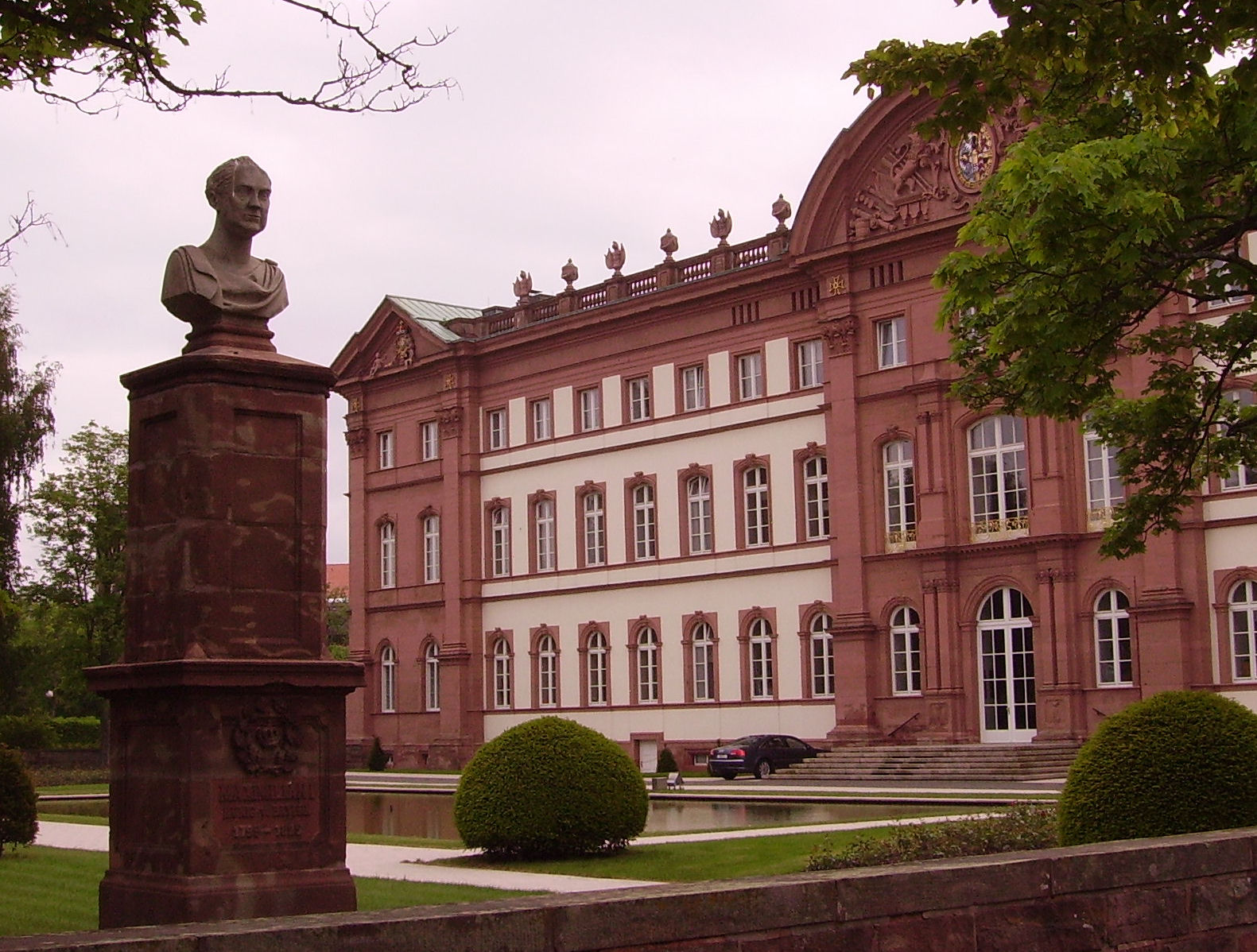
A view from the south-east. The bust is of King Maximilian I
