= Hermann Weinkauff =

German jurist (1894–1981)

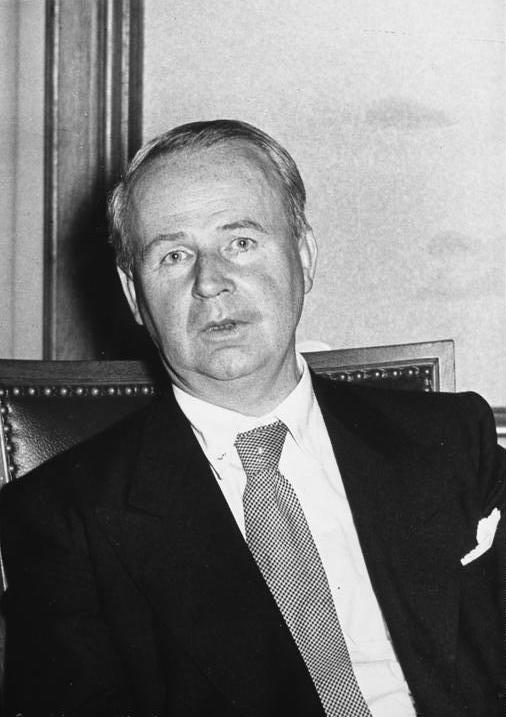
- Weinkauff in 1951

1st President of the Federal Court of Justice
- In office 1 October 1950 – 31 March 1960
- Preceded by: Office established
- Succeeded by: Bruno Heusinger

Personal details
- Born: Hermann Karl August Weinkauff; 10 February 1894 Trippstadt, Kingdom of Bavaria, German Empire
- Died: 9 July 1981 (aged 87) Heidelberg, Bavaria, West Germany

Military service
- Allegiance: German Empire
- Branch/service: Imperial German Army: Bavarian Army
- Years of service: 1914–1918
- Rank: Reserve Lieutenant
- Battles/wars: World War I: Western Front

Hermann Karl August Weinkauff (10 February 1894 – 9 July 1981) was a German jurist. He served in several positions as a judge and later became the first President of the Federal Court of Justice of West Germany.

== Biography ==
Born in Trippstadt, a city in Bavaria, then part of the German Empire, Weinkauff attended the Gymnasium in Speyer, after which he studied law in Munich, Heidelberg, Würzburg, and Paris. In 1912, he joined the Corps Hubertia München, a fraternal organisation.

During World War I, he served from 1914 to 1918 in the field artillery of the Bavarian Army on the Western Front. In 1917, he was promoted to reserve lieutenant.

Weinkauff passed the first juristische Staatsprüfung (a state examination of legal students) in 1920, followed by him passing the second juristische Staatsprüfung in 1922. That same year, he was appointed as a Gerichtsassessor (a provisionally appointed civil servant or judge who has already passed the aforementioned second juristische Staatsprüfung) in the Bavarian State Ministry of Justice, a position he worked in until 1923. From 1924 to 1926, he worked as a prosecutor at the Landgericht München I, a district court in Munich, after which he worked as a magistrate at the Labour Court of Munich until 1928. In the years of 1928 and 1929, he studied French law in Paris.

From 1930 to 1932 he served as Oberamtsrichter (chief magistrate) in the District Court of Berchtesgaden, and as director of the Landgericht München I from 1932 to 1937. On 1 February 1934, Weinkauff joined the Federation of National Socialist German Jurists (German: Bund Nationalsozialistischer Deutscher Juristen; abbr. BNSDJ), and remained a member after the organisation was transformed into the National Socialist Association of Legal Professionals (German: Nationalsozialistischer Rechtswahrerbund; abbr. NSRB). In November 1934, he became a member of the National Socialist People's Welfare (German: Nationalsozialistische Volkswohlfahrt; abbr. NSV) organisation. After 1935, he was a part of the Reichsanwaltschaft, assisting Chief Reich Prosecutor Karl August Werner; afterwards, he became I. Assistant Judge at the Reich Court (German: Reichsgericht), working in the III. Punitive Senate (German: III. Strafsenat) under President of the Court Erwin Bumke, where he was, among other things, responsible for criminal cases of "Racial Defilement", known as "Rassenschande". On 1 March 1937, Weinkauff was promoted to the Reich Court Council (German: Reichsgerichtsrat), despite not being a member of the National Socialist German Worker's Party. Bumke justified this promotion by writing:

"Your conduct has shown that you will ruthlessly support the National Socialist state. You have provided proof of your Aryan ancestry."

In 2015, evidence came to light that Weinkauff was partially responsible for a judgement on appeal on 2 September 1936 regarding the Blutschutzgesetz, part of the Nuremberg Race Laws, in which he, among four other judges, ruled whether or not the defendant was to be classified as Jewish. After the appeal was rejected, the sentence of a man deemed as "Jewish" by the authorities who had had a romantic relationship with a woman classified as "German" was deemed justified by the court.

After World War II, Weinkauff was interned in an American internment camp. On 1 April 1946, he became the president of the newly restored District Court of Bamberg, after which he became the president of the Supreme District Court of Bavaria. In early October 1950, Federal President Theodor Heuss named him the first president of the Federal Court of Justice (German: Bundesgerichtshof; abbr. BGH).

In 1951, the University of Heidelberg awarded him an honorary doctorate. He retired on 1 March 1960. Afterwards, he received the fourth-highest class of the Federal Cross of Merit as well as the Bavarian Cross of Merit on 9 May 1961. During his retirement, Weinkauff authored several books and articles in magazines concerning legal matters. He died at age 87 in Heidelberg.

== Controversy and writings ==
Weinkauff attracted considerable public attention as the president of the Federal Court of Justice in 1953, when he sharply criticised a verdict by the Federal Constitutional Court (German: Bundesverfassungsgericht; abbr. BVerfG) and refused to follow the legal opinion of the court, which never again happened in the history of West Germany and Germany after 1991. The verdict came as a result of 34 former members of the Gestapo appealing to the Constitutional Court in order to be reinstated as civil servants, which the court refused, stating that the framework of civil servant status of Nazi Germany ceased to exist on 8 May 1945 and thus the man no longer had any claim to the status of civil servant. Besides Weinkauff, several other judges who had participated in the legal system of Nazi Germany also protested the decision of the court. He sharply disagreed with the Constitutional Court's listing of the atrocities committed by civil servants and judges during the Nazi era, stating that they did not meaningfully impact the work of the vast majority of the civil servants of that time. In his statement, he mostly based himself of the legal opinions of other high-ranking judges of the early Federal Republic, who were mostly former judges of the Nazi era.

In his book The German Judiciary and National Socialism, Weinkauff supported the thesis of legal scholar Gustav Radbruch that the German judiciare was completely powerless against the authority of the Nazi regime due to the doctrine of legal positivism, and thus could not have prevented any injustice perpetrated by the regime. Additionally, he described a thesis of a religiously inspired natural law which he also attempted to integrate into the verdicts of the Federal Court of Justice during his tenure.

His thesis of powerlessness of the judiciary is very controversial. From his point of view, jurists of the Nazi regime were bound by the legal positivist maxim of "law is law", which prevented them from doing anything against injustices committed by the regime. Opponents of this thesis state that the German judiciary between 1933 and 1945 was not a victim of the regime at all, but rather, according to legal scholar Udo Reifner:

"Judges and prosecutors, administrative lawyers and law professors, and to a certain smaller extent also ordinary lawyers, participated out of their own convictions and professional matter of course within the process of construction of the 'Third Reich' and, for this purpose, abused the institution of the legal system."

The historian Hans-Ulrich Wehler described the thesis of Weinkauff regarding National Socialism in the legal system as "unbearable apologetics".

== Selected works ==
- Die Französische Justizreform von 1926–1929, in: Juristische Rundschau (JR) 1929, 221 ff.
- Das Naturrecht in evangelischer Sicht, in: Werner Maihofer (Hrsg.), Naturrecht oder Rechtspositivismus?, Darmstadt 1962, S. 211 ff.
- Richtertum und Rechtsfindung in Deutschland, Tübingen 1952.
- Die Militäropposition gegen Hitler und das Widerstandsrecht, in: Europäische Publikation e.V. (Hrsg.), Vollmacht des Gewissens. Probleme des militärischen Widerstandes gegen Hitler, Bd. 1, Frankfurt am Main u. a. 1960, S. 152 ff.
- Das Naturrecht und die Große Justizreform. Gedanken über die Grundfragen der Rechtsprechung, in: Frankfurter Rundschau (FR) 6 April 1960.
- Über das Widerstandsrecht. Vortrag, gehalten vor der juristischen Studiengesellschaft in Karlsruhe [...], Karlsruhe 1956.
- Die deutsche Justiz und der Nationalsozialismus, Stuttgart 1968.

== Bibliography ==
- Ralf Dreier (Hrsg.): Recht und Justiz im Dritten Reich. Berlin 1989.
- Friedrich Karl Kaul: Geschichte des Reichsgerichts. 1933–1945, Bd. 4, Glashütte im Taunus, 1971.
- Ingo Müller: Furchtbare Juristen, München 1987.
- Hubert Schorn: Der Richter im Dritten Reich, Frankfurt 1959.
- Klaus-Detlev Godau-Schüttke: Der Bundesgerichtshof – Justiz in Deutschland, Berlin 2005.
- Daniel Herbe: Hermann Weinkauff (1894–1981) – Der erste Präsident des Bundesgerichtshofs (= Beiträge zur Rechtsgeschichte des 20. Jahrhunderts. Band 55). Mohr Siebeck Verlag, Tübingen 2008, ISBN 978-3-16-160391-4.
