= Robert Fischer (judge) =

German judge (1911–1983)

Robert Fischer (22 August 1911 – 4 March 1983) was a German jurist who served as the third President of the Federal Court of Justice of West Germany from 1968 to 1977, succeeding Bruno Heusinger.

== Biography ==
Fischer was born in Gießen in 1911, the son of Hans Albrecht Fischer, a professor specialising in Roman law, Civil law and legal philosophy. From 1932 to 1934, he studied law at the University of Tübingen, where he became a part of the Academic Union “Igel” (German for hedgehog), as well as at the universities of Breslau and Jena. In 1935 he graduated while studying under the auspices of Alfred Hueck, to whom he remained connected throughout his life. After passing the second Staatsexamen in 1938, he became a legal professional for the Deutsche Bank. During World War II, he served as a reserve officer. Once the war concluded in 1945, he decided to pursue a career as a judge. Following the war's conclusion, he was appointed Director and Deputy President of the State Court in Göttingen. In 1950, he was appointed a judge at the Federal Court of Justice. After being offered a professorship at the University of Cologne, which he rejected, he became the chairman of the II. Civil Senate (German: II. Zivilsenat). On 1 January 1963, he was appointed President of the Senate, and after President of the Federal Court of Justice Bruno Heusinger retired, Fischer was appointed his successor on 1 April 1968. He held this position until his own retirement on 30 September 1977, being succeeded by Gerd Pfeiffer.

Alongside his judicial activity, Fischer actively busied himself in legal studies, commenting several scientific essays. He died in 1983.

== Selected works ==
- Gesammelte Schriften – Grundfragen revisionsgerichtl. Rechtsprechung u. Beitr. zum Gesellschaftsrecht, Berlin 1985, ISBN 3-11-009961-6

== Bibliography ==
- Marcus Lutter u. a. (Hrsg.): Festschrift für Robert Fischer. Berlin 1979.
