= Acte clair =

EU legal doctrine

Acte clair is a doctrine of European Union law, which states that if a judgment or rule of law is clear enough, then a member state has no duty to refer a question for preliminary ruling to the Court of Justice of the European Union.

The acte clair doctrine originated in the judgment of the Court of Justice in Srl CILFIT v Ministry of Health (1982), from which developed what has been termed the 'CILFIT criteria'. Though it had initially been believed that the Court of Justice would be strict as to its application, scholarly papers claim that CILFIT criteria, although often quoted in judgments and doctrine, have been applied neither consistently nor truly rigidly by the Court. Instead, a more flexible approach to acte clair requirements is taking shape.
