= Hitler's Justice =

1987 book by Ingo Muller

Hitler's Justice: The Courts of the Third Reich
- Title page in original German language, Furchtbare Juristen: Die unbewältigte Vergangenheit unserer Justiz (1987)
- Author: Ingo Müller
- Original title: Furchtbare Juristen: Die unbewältigte Vergangenheit unserer Justiz
- Language: German
- Genre: Non-fiction
- Publication date: 1987
- English publication date: 1991

Hitler's Justice: The Courts of the Third Reich (German: Furchtbare Juristen: Die unbewältigte Vergangenheit unserer Justiz) is a book by Ingo Müller that profiles cases from the Weimar Republic, Nazi Germany, and West Germany and arguing for a continuity in the German judicial system. It was first published in German in 1987, and a translation into English was published in 1991.
