= Klaus Tolksdorf =

German legal scholar

Klaus Tolksdorf (born 14 November 1948) is a German legal scholar who served as the eighth President of the Federal Court of Justice of Germany from 2008 to 2014 as well as an ad litem judge of the International Criminal Tribunal for the former Yugoslavia.

== Life ==
Tolksdorf was born in Gelsenkirchen on 14 November 1948. After getting the Abitur in Wiesbaden in June 1967 he became a police officer in North Rhine-Westphalia until 1970 before he started studying law at the University of Bonn between 1969 and 1974. After that he had his judicial traineeship, the so-called “Referendariat” at the Higher Regional Court of Cologne (“Landgericht”). It began in 1975 and ended in 1978.

Following his second German state exam in law in Düsseldorf 1978 he became a judge in civil and criminal law at the regional court of Bonn until 1979. Between 1979 and 1982 he was a lecturer in law at the institute for criminal law of the University of Münster. Afterwards he became a judge in civil law at the regional court of Münster.

During 1985 and 1988 he worked at the 6th civil panel of the German Federal Court of Justice and later at the local president office. 1988 he did his doctoral degree and he became a judge at the higher regional court (“Oberlandesgericht”) of Hamm as well. Then he worked as a research assistant at the Federal Constitutional Court of Germany (“Bundesverfassungsgericht”) until 1991. Since 1992 he is a judge at the Federal Court of Justice. Initially he was just as a member of the criminal panel (jurisdiction for general criminal law and motoring crimes), since 1994 he was a member of the penal for notary law until 1997 as well, since 1995 he was a member of the grand panel for criminal law until 2005 and finally he was a judge in the office of the president.

He is teaching criminal law and criminal procedure law at the faculty of law of the university of Münster since 1994, too. There he became an honorary professor in 1999. In 2001 he was appointed as a presiding judge of the 3rd criminal panel of the Federal Court of Justice (jurisdiction for general criminal law and crimes against the state). Since 2004 he is also a German member of the Joint Supervisory Body (JSB) of Eurojust. He became the chairman of the JSB in 2007, too. Furthermore, he was elected as an Ad-Litem-Judge of the International Criminal Tribunal for the former Yugoslavia (ICTY) in 2005. From February 2008 to January 2014 he was the president of the German Federal Court of Justice.
