= Federal Court of Justice =

Highest court in the system of ordinary jurisdiction in Germany

Coordinates: 49°00′22″N 8°23′48″E

- Bundesgerichtshof
- Established: 1 October 1950
- Jurisdiction: Federal Republic of Germany
- Location: Karlsruhe and Leipzig
- Composition method: Election by Judicial Selection Committee
- Authorised by: Basic Law of Germany
- Number of positions: 153 judges (as of 15 January 2023)
- Language: German
- Website: bundesgerichtshof.de

President
- Currently: Karin Angerer
- Since: 1 September 2026

Vice President
- Currently: Jürgen Ellenberger
- Since: 2 December 2016

The Federal Court of Justice (German: Bundesgerichtshof [bʊndəsɡəˈʁɪçtsˌhoːf], BGH [beːɡeːˈhaː]) is the highest court of civil and criminal jurisdiction in Germany. Its primary responsibility is the final appellate review of decisions by lower courts for errors of law. While, legally, a decision by the Federal Court of Justice is only binding with respect to the individual case in which it enters, de facto the court's interpretation of the law is followed by lower courts with almost no exception. Decisions handed down by the Federal Court of Justice can only be vacated by the Federal Constitutional Court for violating a provision of the German constitution, the Basic Law.

In addition to the court's appellate duties, a few judges of the Federal Court of Justice act as investigating judges in criminal investigations led by the Public Prosecutor General for a small number of exceptional offenses (such as crimes against humanity and the formation of terrorist organisations). As such, they are responsible for issuing search and arrest warrants, among other things.

The German legal order has different supreme courts for the different branches of its judiciary. The four sister supreme courts of the Federal Court of Justice are the Federal Administrative Court (for administrative matters), the Federal Fiscal Court (for tax matters), the Federal Labor Court (for matters of labour law), and the Federal Social Court (for social security matters).

The seat of the Federal Court of Justice is in Karlsruhe. Three criminal divisions of the court are based in Leipzig.

== History ==
=== Predecessors ===
The Reichskammergericht, which was established in 1495 as the highest court of the Holy Roman Empire, is often viewed as the institutional origin of supreme court jurisprudence in Germany. The court arose out of an attempt by the Imperial Estates to counter the influence of the Emperor, which led to the somewhat unusual circumstance of the coexistence of two supreme courts with concurrent jurisdiction over most matters. The emperor's own Aulic Council (Reichshofrat) in Vienna had sole jurisdiction over criminal cases, however.

As the Empire was dissolved in 1806, so were the two supreme courts. What ensued was a prolonged period of judicial independence of the dozens of newly-sovereign German states within the German Confederation. In the states of central and northern Germany, this changed following the foundation of the North German Confederation, where the Leipzig-based Bundesoberhandelsgericht commenced operation in August 1870. In the beginning, the court's supreme appellate jurisdiction was largely limited to trade law matters, but after the southern German states joined the Confederation in November 1870 to form the German Empire, the court—now known as Reichsoberhandelsgericht—received jurisdiction over various additional areas of civil law.

In 1879, the Reichsoberhandelsgericht was replaced with the Reichsgericht. Also located in Leipzig, the Reichsgericht enjoyed far broader supreme appellate jurisdiction than its predecessors, encompassing all civil and criminal matters arising in the Empire. The enactment of a unified Imperial Penal Code in 1872 added to the significance of the court. In the wake of Germany's defeat in World War II, the Reichsgericht, like all German courts, was closed, and its administration subsequently dismantled, by proclamation of General Eisenhower of the United States Army on 18 April 1945.

In the British occupation zone, the Supreme Court for the British Zone (Oberster Gerichtshof für die Britische Zone) came into operation in 1948. The court was tasked with ensuring the uniform jurisprudence within the zone; to that end, its scope of jurisdiction and its procedural rules largely followed the example of the Reichsgericht. The foundation of the Bizonal Economic Council by the British and the Americans also led to the establishment of a German High Court for the Combined Economic Area (Deutsches Obergericht für das Vereinigte Wirtschaftsgebiet) with supreme appellate jurisdiction over matters of the public and private economic law created through Bizonal legislation.

=== Establishment ===
In May 1949, the Basic Law (Grundgesetz) was enacted, establishing the Federal Republic of Germany. Article 96(1) of the Basic Law provided that "higher federal courts shall be established for the spheres of ordinary, administrative, finance, labour and social jurisdiction." Roughly a year later, it was decided by the German federal parliament, the Bundestag, that the "higher federal court" of ordinary (i.e., civil and criminal) jurisdiction was to be named Bundesgerichtshof (Federal Court of Justice) and that its seat was to be in the city of Karlsruhe. The location of the new supreme courts had been a matter of considerable debate at the time. Karlsruhe's most serious contender had been Cologne, where both the Supreme Court for the British Zone and the German High Court for the Combined Economic Area were based, but the Karlsruhe proposal ultimately found a large majority in the relevant parliamentary committee.

End of year	Divisions	
End of year	Civil	Criminal
1950	5	4
1955	6	6
1960	8	5
1965	9	5
1970	10	5

The Federal Court of Justice was established effective 1 October 1950 and began operating a day later. The Supreme Court for the British Zone ceased operations a day earlier and all cases pending before the court were transferred to the Federal Court of Justice. Of the 54 judgeships initially authorised for the court, only 12 were immediately filled, although that number quickly rose to 42 within the first three months of the court's operation; by July 1952 it stood at 86. New divisions were established, including a criminal division based in Berlin, 500 kilometres north-east of Karlsruhe. The steep increase in judgeships in the first years of the court's existence was in part the result of a higher-than-expected workload of the court, and in part the result of legislative changes that broadened the court's scope of responsibility. At the same time, the Reichsgericht's practice of employing assistant judges (Hilfsrichter) had been outlawed.

Only in 1995 did the Federal Court of Justice admit to the failed processing of the Third Reich justice system.

== Location and premises ==
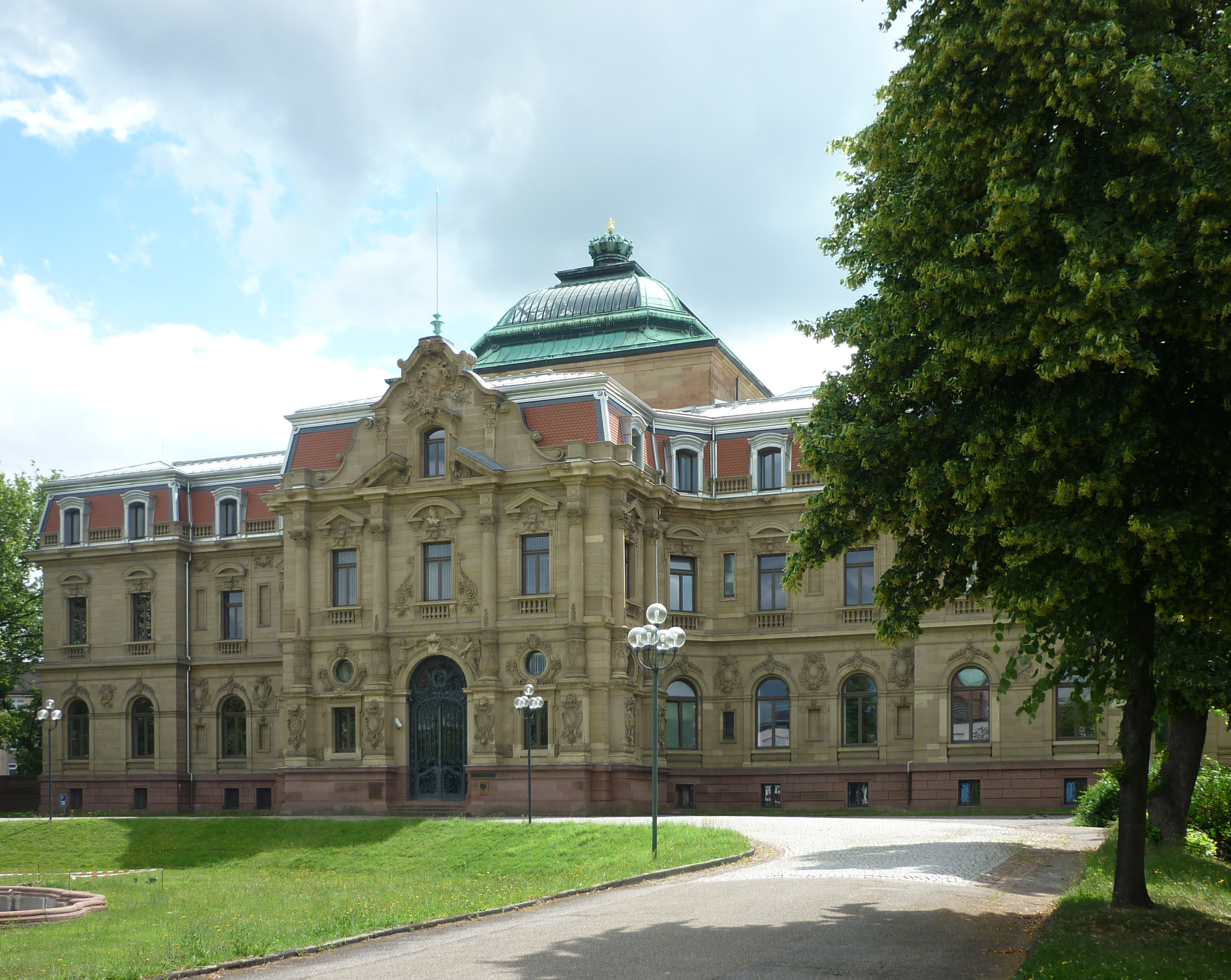
Hereditary Grand Ducal Palace, seat of the Federal Court of Justice in Karlsruhe

The Federal Court of Justice is housed in five buildings on park-like premises in the centre of Karlsruhe, Herrenstraße 45 a. The main building is the Hereditary Grand Ducal Palace (Erbgrossherzogliches Palais) built in 1891 to 1897 by Josef Durm. During WWII its dome was destroyed and the mansard floor caught fire.

In the 1990s the Federal Prosecutor General's Office was separated off of the Federal Court of Justice and housed in a new building in Brauerstrasse.

In October 2003, an extension building was inaugurated. The large library contains the Museum of Legal History (Rechtshistorisches Museum).

In April 2012, a new reception building with large courtroom opened. Up until then the garden had been used as a helicopter landing pad for defendants being flown in.

The Court has two branch offices, such as the Villa Reiss in the Gartenstrasse and a former Bundeswehr barracks in the Rintheimer Strasse, Karlsruhe.

Since July 1997, the 5th Criminal Panel, since February 2020, the 6th Criminal Panel and since July 2026 the 7th Criminal Panel have been housed at Villa Sack in Leipzig, Karl-Heine-Strasse.

== Judges ==
=== Requirements ===
Judges must meet the personal requirements for lifetime judicial appointments; in particular, they must be German citizens and must have the necessary educational background. Judges of the Federal Court of Justice also have to be 35 years of age or older.

=== Selection and appointment ===
Source:; View source data.

The judges of the Federal Court of Justice are selected by an electoral committee (Richterwahlausschuss) consisting of the Ministers of Justice of the 16 German Bundesländer and of 16 representatives appointed by the German federal parliament, the Bundestag. In practice, the Bundestag usually appoints some of its own members (and occasionally former members) to the committee. Nominations for new judicial appointments can be made by the Federal Minister of Justice or members of the electoral committee. The electoral committee's meetings are non-public and the committee's vote is done by secret ballot. To be elected, a candidate needs a simple majority of the votes. Elected candidates are appointed by the Federal President of Germany (Bundespräsident).

As of 2023, the Federal Court of Justice has 153 judges. The number of authorised judgeships at the Federal Court of Justice is set by the Bundestag as part of the annual Federal Budget Act. The federal government has a constitutional duty to ensure the adequate staffing of the Federal Court of Justice and its sister supreme courts.

=== Retirement ===
As judges for life, judges of the Federal Court of Justice must retire upon reaching the retirement age. The retirement age is between 65 and 67 years, depending on the year of birth.

== Organisation ==
=== Divisions of the court ===
The Federal Court of Justice consists of 13 divisions responsible for civil matters (Zivilsenate) and seven divisions responsible for criminal matters (Strafsenate). Each judge of the court is assigned to at least one civil or criminal division, with both civil and criminal divisions presently consisting of approximately eight judges each. Judges can serve on more than one division, in which case their working time is split. Cases are never decided by all the members of a division but, in general, by a panel of five judges (Spruchgruppe).

In addition, there are eight special divisions (Spezialsenate), which have specific responsibilities and are made up of judges from the civil and criminal divisions; some of those divisions also include appointed volunteers with specific expertise relevant to the division's specialisation. The lion's share of the work is, however, done within the civil and criminal divisions: Of the approximately 10,400 new matters brought before the Court in 2021, about 10,200 fell within the scope of responsibility of a criminal or civil division.

As in all German courts, an annually revised schedule of responsibilities (Geschäftsverteilungsplan) specifies in detail the allocation of cases to divisions, and each division's internal schedule of responsibilities determines the allocation of cases to a five-judge panel. The allocation of cases to divisions is fundamentally different in civil matters than in criminal matters: Each of the civil divisions has specific subject matter responsibilities. For instance, civil disputes concerning copyright law are handled by the First Civil Division, while disputes concerning inheritance law are handled by the Fourth. In practice, these responsibilities are rarely changed, which leads to a high degree of specialisation of the individual divisions. Criminal cases, on the other hand, are assigned to a criminal division based primarily on the origin of the case, with each division handling the appeals from a certain subset of court districts. For instance, criminal appeals from courts in Berlin are always decided by the Fifth Criminal Division. A few exceptions to this location-based assignment exist; for example, one of the criminal divisions has a special responsibility for road traffic-related criminal matters and another one has exclusive responsibility for national security matters.

Each division of the Federal Court of Justice has a presiding judge. Presiding judges are regular judges of the Federal Court of Justice who are proposed for this additional role by the Federal Minister of Justice and appointed by the Federal President of Germany. A presiding judge's vote on a given case carries the same weight as that of any of the associate judges on the panel, but a presiding judge does have some additional influence on the jurisprudence of their division due to the fact that they are a member of every five-judge panel of their division.

=== President and presidium of the court ===
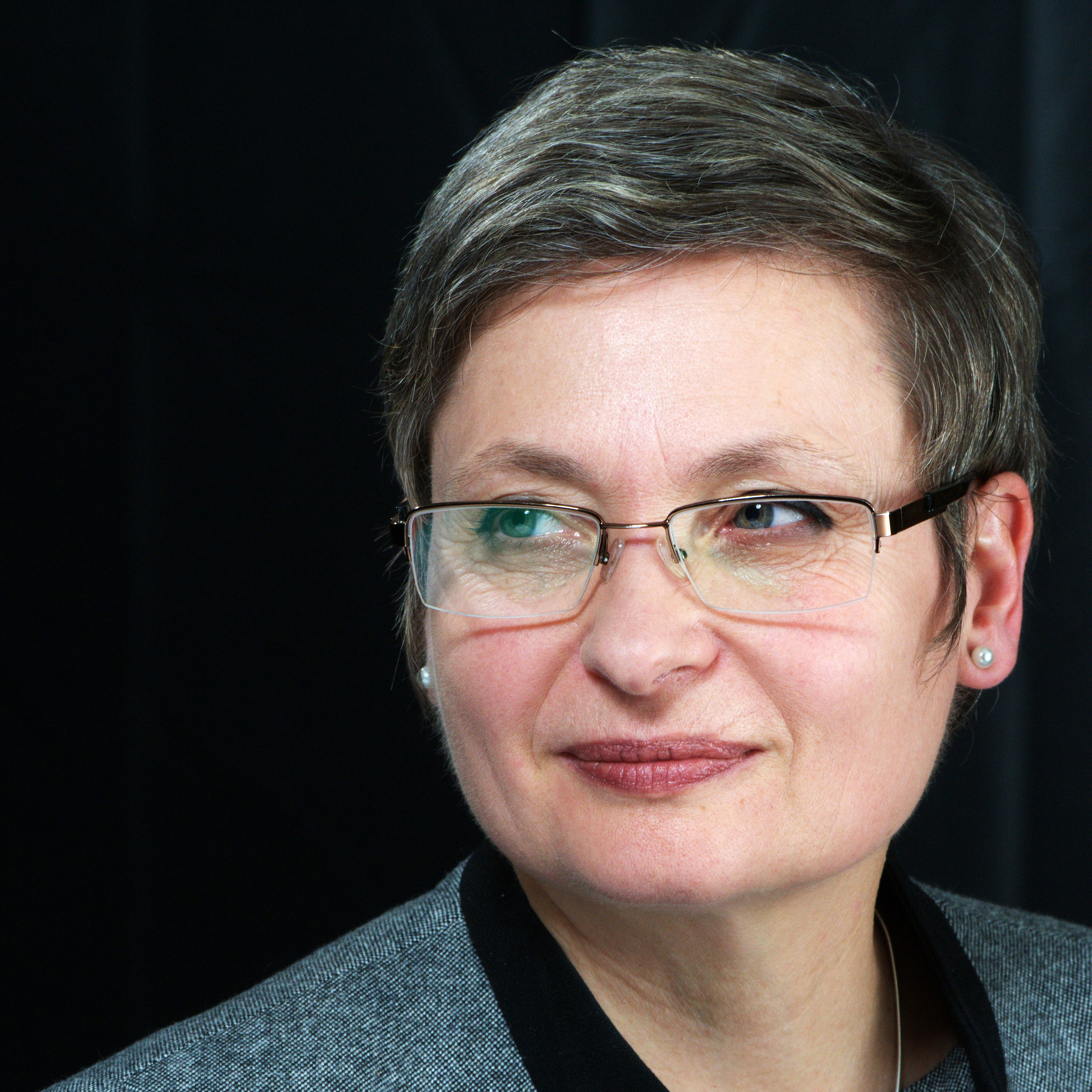
Bettina Limperg (2013), president of the court since 2014

The Federal Court of Justice has a president and a presidium.

The president of the Federal Court of Justice is a regular judge of the court who has been proposed for this additional role by the Federal Minister of Justice and has been so appointed by the Federal President of Germany. The president of the court has a dual role: The president of the court must serve as the presiding judge of at least one civil or criminal division of the court, in addition to being the presiding judge of the Grand Panels, the Joint Panel, and one of the special divisions. At the same time, the president serves in a key administrative role, supervising the other judges of the court, the court's academic staff, civil servants, and employees and may also participate in the preparation of legislative projects by issuing opinions.

The following is a list of all presidents of the Federal Court of Justice since the court's establishment:

	Name	Took office	Left office
1	Hermann Weinkauff (1894–1981)	1 October 1950	31 March 1960
2	Bruno Heusinger (1900–1987)	1 April 1960	31 March 1968
3	Robert Fischer (1911–1983)	1 April 1968	30 September 1977
4	Gerd Pfeiffer (1919–2007)	1 October 1977	31 December 1987
5	Walter Odersky (b. 1931)	1 January 1988	31 July 1996
6	Karlmann Geiß (1935–2025)	1 August 1996	31 May 2000
7	Günter Hirsch (b. 1943)	15 July 2000	31 January 2008
8	Klaus Tolksdorf (b. 1948)	1 February 2008	31 January 2014
9	Bettina Limperg (b. 1960)	1 July 2014	31 August 2026
10	Karin Angerer (b. 1964)	1 September 2026	

The presidium of the Federal Court of Justice consists of the president and ten other judges of the court. The ten other members of the presidium are elected by all judges of the court. Among other duties, it is the responsibility of the presidium to assign new judges to one or more divisions of the court. Judges can also be reassigned to other divisions by the presidium at the beginning of each calendar year (and, in exceptional circumstances, during the year). In addition, the presidium can appoint a judge as one of the investigating judges of the court.

== Jurisdiction ==
=== Role of the court in civil matters ===
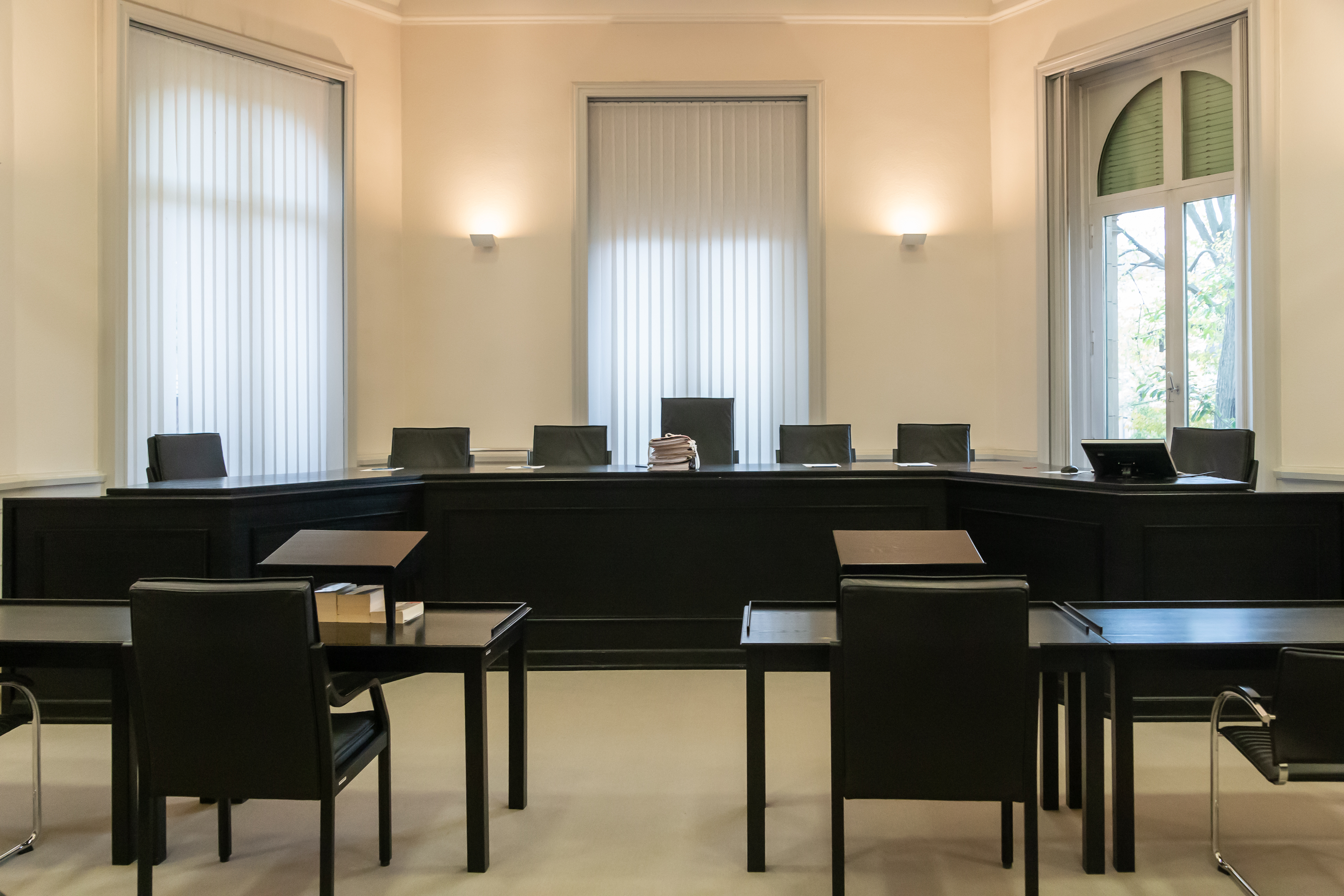
Courtroom of a civil division in the Hereditary Grand Ducal Palace

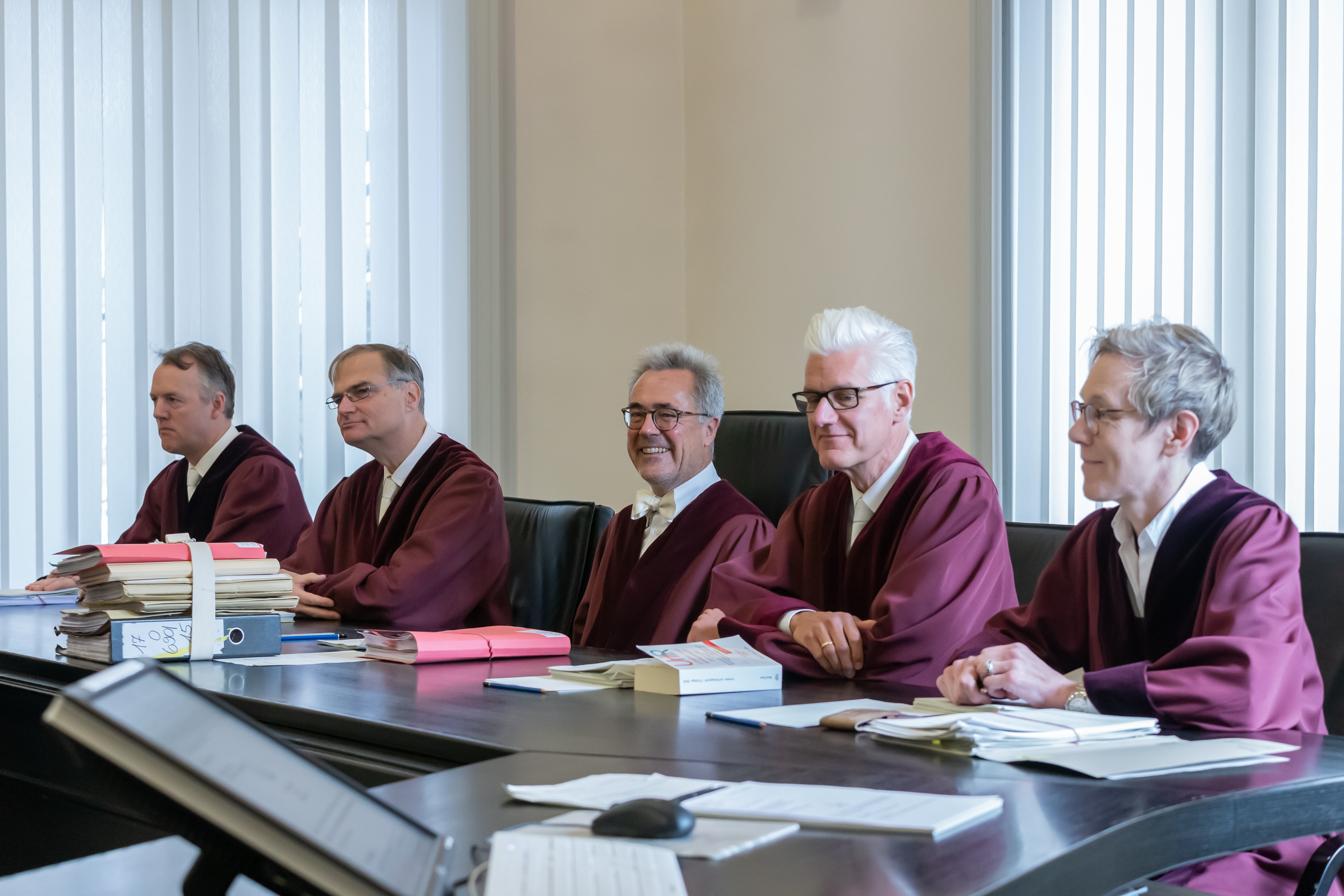
Judges of a civil division before an oral argument

The civil divisions of the Federal Court of Justice primarily deal with appeals on points of law (Revision) and complaints against denial of leave to appeal on points of law (Nichtzulassungsbeschwerde).

In a typical civil case in Germany, the losing party in the court of first instance can appeal to a court of second instance if the subject matter of the appeal is greater than 600 euros or the court of first instance expressly allowed the appeal. Such an appeal (Berufung) can be both on points of fact and on points of law, and it prompts the appellate court to re-hear the entire matter (that is, it (re-)hears witnesses, including potential new witnesses, and re-tries material issues of fact).

In some cases, the decision by the appellate court can then be further appealed to the Federal Court of Justice—but this time only on points of law. Examples of such points of law are (alleged) procedural defects or an incorrect understanding of the law that led to the lower court's decision. The Federal Court of Justice itself does not receive additional evidence, nor does it hear witnesses, and conducts its review of the lower court's decision based on the briefs submitted by counsel, the record of lower court proceedings, and oral argument. In some instances where the five judges of the panel unanimously find that an appeal is inadmissible or has no chance of success, they can dismiss it without oral argument.

In general, bringing a civil case to the Federal Court of Justice requires a grant of leave to appeal by the appellate court. An appellate court is legally required to grant leave if (a) the legal matter is of fundamental significance or if (b) the further development of the law or the interests in ensuring uniform adjudication require a decision to be handed down by the Federal Court of Justice. If leave to appeal is granted, the Federal Court of Justice is bound by this determination of the lower court and has to take the case. Should an injured party feel that the appellate court has wrongly decided not to grant leave to appeal, they can file a Nichtzulassungsbeschwerde with the Federal Court of Justice provided that the subject matter of the appeal is greater than €20,000. If the Federal Court of Justice agrees that leave to appeal on a point of law was wrongly denied, it grants leave on its own and subsequently rules on the appeal.

To the extent the appeal on points of law is deemed justified, the Federal Court of Justice reverses the contested judgment and remands the matter (sends it back) to the lower court, which decides on it once again. In doing so, the lower court must comply with the Federal Court of Justice's decision.

=== Role of the court in criminal matters ===
The criminal divisions of the Federal Court of Justice primarily deal with appeals on points of law (Revision).

In Germany, criminal cases involving lesser offenses are decided in the first instance by a district court (Amtsgericht), while more serious offenses are initially decided by panels of regional courts (Landgerichte) or, in few cases, higher regional courts (Oberlandesgerichte). Criminal cases originating in a regional or higher regional court can subsequently be appealed to the Federal Court of Justice on points of law. Unlike in civil cases, no grant of leave is required to appeal.

An appeal can be brought by the defendant or the public prosecutor's office. In some trials, the public prosecutor is joined by one or more private accessory prosecutors (Nebenkläger), which is a role that can be assumed by the victims of a number of serious offenses such as murder or sexual abuse, or by individuals whose children, parents, siblings, spouses or life partners were killed through an unlawful act. Private accessory prosecutors also have a right to initiate an appeal to the Federal Court of Justice, although their ability to appeal is somewhat more limited.

As in civil matters, appeals on points of law in criminal matters may allege procedural defects or an incorrect understanding of the law that led to the trial court's decision, and—again as in civil cases—the Federal Court of Justice itself does not receive additional evidence, nor does it hear witnesses. Instead, it conducts its review of the lower court's decision based on the briefs submitted by counsel and the record of lower court proceedings. In some instances where the five judges of the panel unanimously find that a criminal appeal is inadmissible or has no chance of success, they can dismiss it without oral argument. Unlike in civil matters, a panel can also unanimously decide in favour of a defendant without oral argument. In other cases, oral argument is held.

To the extent the appeal on points of law is deemed justified, the Federal Court of Justice vacates the contested judgement and sends the matter back to the regional or higher regional court, respectively. In general, vacating a judgement does not mean setting aside the trial court's factual findings. However, the Federal Court of Justice quashes factual findings insofar as they are affected by the violation of law by virtue of which the judgment is vacated. Therefore, a grave procedural defect may lead to an entirely new trial; on the other hand, if a trial court improperly did not find a particular offense on the basis of an incorrect understanding of its legal requirements, the factual findings may be left in place entirely, and the trial court, as the basis for its new judgement, may only have to take additional evidence pertaining to the (previously misunderstood) requirements of said offense. In a minority of cases, the Federal Court of Justice can also decide a case on the merits without sending it back. This can occur, for instance, when a trial court has made a finding about the defendant's actions pertaining to an offense committed by someone else and has determined on that basis that the defendant is guilty of aiding the third party in committing the offense; if the Federal Court of Justice later deems the defendant's actions—as found by the trial court—insufficient to justify a conviction as an aider, the Federal Court of Justice may acquit the defendant.

=== Investigating judges ===
Two judges of the Federal Court of Justice (plus four judges acting as their deputies) serve as the investigating judges (Ermittlungsrichter) of the court. In the German criminal law system, investigating judges are responsible for deciding on arrests, provisional placements, seizures, searches, and other measures in relation to a criminal investigation. The jurisdiction of the investigating judges of the Federal Court of Justice is limited to investigations for a small subset of crimes, such as war crimes, crimes against humanity, high treason and the formation of terrorist organisations, where the Public Prosecutor General (Generalbundesanwalt) leads the investigation. The Public Prosecutor General may also take over an investigation of various more ordinary offenses (including murder, manslaughter and abduction) under certain circumstances (for instance where the offence is capable of undermining the continued existence or security of the Federal Republic of Germany) and when it deems the crime to be of "special significance". In such cases as well, the investigating judges of the Federal Court of Justice have jurisdiction.

=== Special divisions ===
Appeals of decisions in some particular areas of the law are handled by special divisions of the court. The following table lists the special divisions of the Federal Court of Justice.

Division	Composition of deciding panels	Legal basis
Agricultural matters (Landwirtschaftssenat)	three judges + two appointed volunteers who work or have worked in farming	
Professional and disciplinary matters concerning lawyers (Senat für Anwaltssachen)	three judges including the president of the Federal Court of Justice + two appointed volunteers who are lawyers	
Professional and disciplinary matters concerning notaries public (Senat für Notarsachen)	three judges + two appointed volunteers who are notaries public	
Professional and disciplinary matters concerning patent attorneys (Senat für Patentanwaltssachen)	three judges + two appointed volunteers who are patent attorneys	
Professional and disciplinary matters concerning tax consultants and tax agents (Senat für Steuerberater- und Steuerbevollmächtigtensachen)	three judges + two appointed volunteers who are tax consultants or tax agents	
Professional and disciplinary matters concerning auditors (Senat für Wirtschaftsprüfersachen)	three judges + two appointed volunteers who are auditors	
Cartel Division (Kartellsenat)	five judges	
Federal Disciplinary Tribunal (Dienstgericht des Bundes)	three judges of the Federal Court of Justice + two judges from the judicial branch of which the affected judge is a member	

All judges of the Federal Court of Justice that serve in a special division are regular members of a civil and/or criminal division.

=== Grand Panels and Joint Panel ===
All divisions of the court are at liberty to deviate from their own prior jurisprudence at any time. However, when a panel wishes to deviate from the jurisprudence of one or more other divisions, it must submit a request to those divisions (Divergenzvorlage), asking them whether they stand by their prior decision(s). If any of the divisions do, and if the requesting panel still intends to deviate, it must refer the issue to a Grand Panel. In cases of disagreement between civil divisions, the ultimate arbiter is the Grand Panel for Civil Matters (Großer Senat für Zivilsachen), a special panel of the court composed of the presiding judges of each of the 13 civil divisions and the president of the court; in cases of disagreement between criminal divisions, the issue is referred to the Grand Panel for Criminal Matters (Großer Senat für Strafsachen), which is made up of two representatives from each of the six criminal divisions and the president of the court. If a difference of opinion arises between a criminal and a civil division, the dispute must be resolved by the Joint Grand Panels (Vereinigte Große Senate), which consists of all the members of the Civil and the Criminal Grand Panel.

If any division of the Federal Court of Justice intends to deviate from a decision by one or more divisions of any other German supreme court (i.e. the Federal Administrative Court, the Federal Fiscal Court, the Federal Labour Court, or the Federal Social Court), it must refer the issue to the Joint Panel (Gemeinsamer Senat). The Joint Panel is composed of the presidents of all supreme courts (permanent members) and two judges from each of the divisions involved in the disagreement (ad-hoc members).

In practice, the Divergenzvorlage instrument is used only sparsely. In 2021, not a single question was put before the Grand Panel for Criminal Matters (2020: 2). Between 1951 and 2009, only 36 decisions were issued by the Grand Panel for Civil Matters.

== Attorneys ==
In all civil cases heard by the Federal Court of Justice, the parties need to be represented by an attorney who has been specifically admitted to the bar at the Federal Court of Justice (Rechtsanwalt beim Bundesgerichtshof). This admission is the only 'special' admission within the German court system; ordinarily in Germany, an attorney admitted to the bar may practice before any court. Conversely, within the German court system an attorney at the Federal Court of Justice is only allowed to practice before the Federal Court of Justice, other federal courts of last instance, the Joint Senate of the Supreme Courts of the Federation and the Federal Constitutional Court—but not before any of the lower courts.

Admission to the bar at the Federal Court of Justice is highly selective; as of June 2022, only 38 attorneys are so admitted. Candidates for admission are nominated by an electoral committee (consisting of judges, members of the ordinary bar, and other members of the bar at the Federal Court of Justice) and are then chosen and appointed by the Federal Minister of Justice.

The requirement for a representative specifically admitted to the Federal Court of Justice does not apply in criminal cases. Here, representation by any lawyer admitted to the bar in Germany is sufficient.

== Relation to other courts ==
=== Federal Constitutional Court ===
The Federal Court of Justice, like all German courts of ordinary jurisdiction, is barred from determining that a law or any part of a law violates the German constitution (the Basic Law). If the Federal Court of Justice arrives at the conclusion that a provision is unconstitutional and if the court's desired decision of the case depends on that determination, the court must stay the proceedings and must first obtain a decision from the Federal Constitutional Court (Bundesverfassungsgericht) on the provision's constitutionality.

As is the case with all decisions of ordinary courts in Germany, every decision by the Federal Court of Justice may also itself be the subject of a constitutional complaint (Verfassungsbeschwerde) to the Federal Constitutional Court. However, while any party may lodge such a complaint if they feel that a decision by the Federal Court of Justice infringes their constitutional rights, the constitutional complaint has no suspensive effect. Therefore, if, say, a defendant's appeal on points of law in a criminal case has been dismissed by the Federal Court of Justice, their conviction will enter into force even if the defendant now asks the Constitutional Court to overturn the Federal Court of Justice's decision on constitutional grounds.

=== Court of Justice of the European Union ===
If a decision by the Federal Court of Justice depends on the interpretation of the laws of the European Union, it must stay the proceedings and seek a preliminary ruling from the Court of Justice of the European Union (CJEU) before rendering a final decision in the case. This duty does not arise in situations where the law of the European Union, as interpreted by the CJEU in prior decisions, is sufficiently clear (acte clair doctrine).

In 2022, eleven requests for preliminary ruling were submitted by the Federal Court of Justice to the CJEU.

== Style ==
Judgements by the Federal Court of Justice end with the phrase "von Rechts wegen" ("by virtue of the law"). This formula, which had also been used by the Bundesoberhandelsgericht/Reichsoberhandelsgericht and the Reichsgerichtshof and whose origins can be traced back to the 14th century, is used only by the Federal Labour Court and the Federal Court of Justice, but no other court in the German judicial system.

== Literature ==
- Bundesgerichtshof (2021), The Federal Court of Justice (PDF) (3rd ed.)
- Fischer, Detlev (2021), "Das Ende des Obersten Bundesgerichts im Jahre 1968 – 50 Jahre einheitliche Rechtsprechung der Obersten Gerichtshöfe des Bundes", Journal der Juristischen Zeitgeschichte, 15 (1): 1–13, doi:10.1515/jjzg-2021-0001, S2CID 232281816
- Fischer, Detlev (2015), "Zwischen Leipzig und Karlsruhe, rechtshistorische Reminiszenzen und Wechselwirkungen", Journal der Juristischen Zeitgeschichte, 9 (3): 93–106, doi:10.1515/jjzg-2015-0029, S2CID 185474516
- Fischer, Detlev (2010), "Zur Geschichte der höchstrichterlichen Rechtsprechung in Deutschland", JuristenZeitung, 65 (22): 1077–1087, doi:10.1628/002268810793455442
- Fuchs, Ralf-Peter (2003), "The Supreme Court of the Holy Roman Empire: The State of Research and the Outlook", The Sixteenth Century Journal, 34 (1): 9–27, doi:10.2307/20061311, JSTOR 20061311
- Godau-Schüttke, Klaus-Detlev (2005), Der Bundesgerichtshof: Justiz in Deutschland, Berlin: Tischler, ISBN 3-922654-66-5
- Grieß, Martin (2015), "Im Namen des Rechts": Der Oberste Gerichtshof für die Britische Zone als Höchstgericht in Zivilsachen zwischen Tradition und Neuordnung, Tübingen: Mohr Siebeck, ISBN 978-3-16-153980-0
- Jungmann, Carsten (2009), "Ein neuer 'horror pleni' in den Zivilsenaten des Bundesgerichtshofs: Zum sachgerechten Umgang mit Divergenz- und Grundsatzvorlagen gemäß § 132 GVG zur Sicherung einer einheitlichen Rechtsprechung", JuristenZeitung, 64 (8): 380–388, doi:10.1628/002268809788161446
- Klemmer, Klemens; Wassermann, Rudolf; Wessel, Thomas M. (1993), Deutsche Gerichtsgebäude: Von der Dorflinde über den Justizpalast zum Haus des Rechts, München: Beck, ISBN 3-406-37674-6
- Kotulla, Michael (2008), Deutsche Verfassungsgeschichte: Vom Alten Reich bis Weimar (1495–1934), Berlin: Springer, ISBN 978-3-540-48705-0
- Krüger-Nieland, Gerda, ed. (1975), "Statistischer Teil", 25 Jahre Bundesgerichtshof, München: Beck, pp. 351–391, ISBN 3-406-06175-3
- Nassall, Wendt (2009), "Die Rechtsanwaltschaft beim BGH aus rechtshistorischer Sicht", JuristenZeitung, 64 (22): 1086–1092, doi:10.1628/002268809789919435
- Pauli, Gerhard (1992), Die Rechtsprechung des Reichsgerichts in Strafsachen zwischen 1933 und 1945 und ihre Fortwirkung in der Rechtsprechung des Bundesgerichtshofes, Berlin: De Gruyter, ISBN 3-11-013024-6
- Pfeiffer, Gerd (1990), Karlsruhe auf dem Weg zur Residenz des Rechts, Karlsruhe: Verlag der Gesellschaft für Kulturhistorische Dokumentation, ISBN 3-922596-21-5
- Pieper, Karl-Heinz (1999), Palais im Park: Vom Erbgroßherzoglichen Palais zum Bundesgerichtshof in Karlsruhe, Heidelberg: C.F. Müller, ISBN 3-8114-9974-2
- Press, Volker (1986), "The Habsburg Court as Center of the Imperial Government", Journal of Modern History, 58 (suppl. December 1986): S23–S45, doi:10.1086/243147, JSTOR 1880006, S2CID 158159730
- Schubert, Werner; Glöckner, Hans Peter (2000), "Vom Reichsgericht zum Bundesgerichtshof", Neue Juristische Wochenschrift, 53 (40): 2971–2976
- Wagner, Walter; Willms, Günther (1975), "Der 6. Strafsenat – Legende und Wirklichkeit", in Krüger-Nieland, Gerda (ed.), 25 Jahre Bundesgerichtshof, München: Beck, pp. 265–272, ISBN 3-406-06175-3
- Wassermann, Rudolf (1990), "Karlsruhe oder Leipzig? – Zum Sitz des Bundesgerichtshofs im vereinten Deutschland", Neue Juristische Wochenschrift, 43 (40): 2530–2532
