= Preliminary ruling =

European Court of Justice decision

A preliminary ruling is a decision of the European Court of Justice (ECJ) on the interpretation of European Union law that is given in response to a request (a preliminary reference) from a court or a tribunal of a member state. A preliminary ruling is a final determination of European Union law, with no scope for appeal. The ECJ hands down its decision to the referring court, which is then obliged to implement the ruling.

Preliminary rulings are issued by the ECJ. The Treaty of Lisbon provides that jurisdiction may be delegated to the General Court, but that provision has yet to be put into effect. If, as in Factortame, the ECJ holds that a member state's legislation conflicts with EU law, the member state is required to "disapply" such law, but the ECJ may not amend the member state's legislation itself.

Preliminary rulings make up the bulk of business in the Court of Justice of the European Union since few persons have locus standi to litigate in the Luxembourg court. "Privileged parties" with standing include all member states and EU institutions, but a private person or "undertaking" has standing only if it is the addressee of an EU decision.

== Procedure ==
If a court or tribunal of a member state finds a provision of EU law to be ambiguous, equivocal or unclear, it may seek a preliminary ruling, and a court or tribunal from which there is no appeal must make an application: this may include a body with both first instance and last instance powers. The case before the domestic court will be adjourned until the ECJ ruling is issued. The question to the ECJ must be short and succinct, but it may be accompanied by documents explaining the issue's context and circumstances. There is provision for litigants to comment on the reference: for example, in the case of pressetext Nachrichtenagentur GmbH v Republik Österreich (case C-454/06), the Austria Press Agency (APA) and its subsidiary APA-OTS criticised the reference as "complex and not readily comprehensible". The ECJ may decline to give judgement in the absence of a genuine dispute on the basis that it will not consider "general or hypothetical questions".

Article 267 of the Treaty on the Functioning of the European Union provides:

The Court of Justice of the European Union shall have jurisdiction to give preliminary rulings concerning:

- (a) the interpretation of the Treaties;
- (b) the validity and interpretation of acts of the institutions, bodies, offices or agencies of the Union;

Where such a question is raised before any court or tribunal of a Member State, that court or tribunal may, if it considers that a decision on the question is necessary to enable it to give judgment, request the Court to give a ruling thereon.

Where any such question is raised in a case pending before a court or tribunal of a Member State against whose decisions there is no judicial remedy under national law, that court or tribunal shall bring the matter before the Court.

If such a question is raised in a case pending before a court or tribunal of a Member State with regard to a person in custody, the Court of Justice of the European Union shall act with the minimum of delay.

That is qualified by Article 275 (excluding Common Foreign and Security Policy) and Article 276 (excluding member state acts in the area of freedom, security and justice).

== Right and duty to refer for preliminary ruling ==
The highest court in a jurisdiction must refer and lower courts may refer to Article 267 TFEU. For the rules in the United Kingdom while it was an EU member state, see s 2(1) European Communities Act 1972 and Part 68 Civil Procedure Rules.

Article 267 of the Treaty on the Functioning of the European Union (TFEU), establishing the preliminary reference procedure, differentiates between the right and the duty of national courts to seek a preliminary ruling. Under the discretionary reference stipulated in Article 267(2) TFEU, a national "court or tribunal" may ask the ECJ to give a preliminary ruling if it considers that a decision on the question is "necessary" to enable it to judge a particular case. The obligatory reference (duty to refer) is established in two cases: with respect to national courts adjudicating at last instance (Article 267(3) TFEU) and with respect of all courts faced with a question of the validity of EU law.

The function of the obligation to refer is "to prevent a body of national case law not in accord with the rules of [EU] law from coming into existence in any member state": Case 107/76 Hoffmann-La Roche v Centrafarm at 5. Both the highest court in a member state and the Benelux court has the obligation to refer: Case C-337/95 Parfums Christian Dior v Evora.

The obligation of national courts of last instance to refer for a preliminary ruling when a question of the interpretation of EU law arises is subject to certain exceptions. In accordance with the jurisprudence of the Court, a national court is relieved from the duty to refer when questions of EU law are not relevant to the decision in the main proceedings, if a national court is "materially identical with a question which has already been subject of a preliminary ruling in a similar case" ('acte éclairé') or if when the proper interpretation of EU law is "so obvious as to leave no scope for any reasonable doubt".('acte clair').

=== Courts that may ask questions ===
What constitutes a "court or tribunal" is a matter of EU law and is not to be determined by reference to national law. In determining whether or not a body is a "court or tribunal of Member State", the EU courts take a number of issues into account: whether it is established by law is permanent, has compulsory jurisdiction, has an inter partes procedure, applies rules of law and is independent.

Only a body that "is established by law... is permanent... [whose] jurisdiction is compulsory... [whose] procedure is inter partes... applies rules of law and... is independent" can be a court or tribunal that may refer: Case C-53/03 Syfait v GlaxoSmithKlein at 29. A body with the right to refer under EU law cannot be deprived of it by national law: Cases 146/73 and 166/73 Rheinmühlen.

However, those criteria are not absolute. In Broekmeulen v Huisarts Registratie Commissie, the CJEU ruled that a body established under the auspices of the Royal Netherlands Society for the Promotion of Medicine was a "court or tribunal" within the meaning of the treaty even though the society was a private association. Also, the Benelux Court of Justice was considered a court within that context as a court common to several (Netherlands, Belgium and Luxembourg) member states. Also, the Unified Patent Court, as a court common to several member states is expected to have the ability to ask prejudicial questions.

outside the EU

Also certain courts outside the EU are able (and sometimes obliged to ask for a preliminary ruling).

- UK courts regarding the Brexit withdrawal agreement for 8 years after it entered into force. This happened for the first time in case C682/25 (Crossryn)
- UK courts when applying EU law regarding the free movement of goods in Northern Ireland (Northern Ireland Protocol, article 12.4)
- Monaco and San Marino when applying EU law (based on the association agreement; should it come into force).

== Grounds ==
Such a reference is possible for all EU acts regardless of direct effect: Case C-373/95 Maso and Others v INPS at 28. However, the ECJ will not hear preliminary references arising out of hypothetical disputes: Case 244/80 Foglia v Novello. The ECJ requires the referring court to "define the factual and legal context of the questions it is asking or, at the very least, explain the assumptions of fact on which those questions are based" so that the ECJ can assist the national court.

=== Interpreting non-EU instruments ===
The ECJ is competent to give rulings on the interpretation of treaties to which the EU is a party, as those treaties are considered to be part of EU law. Decisions of the ECJ are in such a case binding only on the EU, not the other parties to the agreement.

The ECJ claims jurisdiction to interpret international agreements concluded by the Council of the European Union since they are acts of an EU institution: Case 181/73 Haegeman v Belgium. That extends to the GATT for which EU has substituted its member states: Case C-267/81 SPI. That also applies to mixed agreements even if the issue only partly falls within EU law: 61996CJ0053 at 32. The ECJ claims jurisdiction even over acts of institutions established by an association agreement: Case C-192/89 Sevince.

In contrast, the claim does not extend to an international agreement that was concluded by a member state before its EU accession if the agreement conflicts with EU law: Case C-158/91 Levy. The ECJ has jurisdiction confined to EU law and cannot consider the extent of reference to EU law by national provisions, which are a matter of national law: Case C-297/88 Dzodzi at 42. The ECJ does not interpret national law that is worded identically to EU provisions: Case C-346/93 Kleinwort Benson v City of Glasgow District Council.

The ECJ is also competent regarding the application of certain treaties between EU member states but may be subject to different procedures. Two such treaties are the 1968 Brussels Convention on jurisdiction in civil and commercial matters and the 1980 Rome Convention on applicable law, which are now mostly replaced by the Brussels I and the Rome I Regulations, respectively.

A peculiarity relates to arbitration on the Brexit withdrawal agreement since arbiters must ask for a preliminary ruling in matters of EU law that is binding upon both the EU and the UK. Based on the same agreement, UK courts must or may ask for a preliminary ruling regarding how Northern Ireland has EU law applied, which is related mainly to trade in goods.

== Effects ==
The ECJ judgment in a reference is declaratory, and remedies, costs, etc. are matters for national courts. The ECJ may choose to rule only on the validity and the interpretation of EU law and to leave the application to the facts to the national court that made the reference: Case 36/74 Walrave and Koch v Union Cycliste Internationale. Alternatively, it may choose to rule very closely to the facts in the case: Case 32/75 Cristini v SNCF.

If the ECJ already ruled on a point in a previous case, there is no obligation to refer: Case 28/62 Da Costa. The decision is then res judicata (at least in the weak sense) and binds the national court a quo that made the reference, and future similar cases on the same issue require no further reference if the answer is "so obvious as to leave no scope for any reasonable doubt": Case 283/81 CILFIT, ECJ Rules of Procedure Article 104(3). "Where national legislation has been the subject of different relevant judicial constructions, some leading to the application of that legislation in compliance with [EU] law, others leading to the opposite application, it must be held that, at the very least, such legislation is not sufficiently clear to ensure its application in compliance with [EU] law": Case C-129/00 Commission v Italy at 33.

The ECJ judgment has the force of res judicata and is binding not only on the national court on whose initiative the reference for a preliminary ruling was made but also on all member states' national courts. In the United Kingdom when it was a member state, res judicata was in the strong sense: a previous ECJ ruling would bind of its courts: s 3(1) European Communities Act 1972.

In the context of a reference for a preliminary ruling concerning validity, if the European instrument is declared invalid, all of the instruments adopted based on it are also invalid. It then falls to the competent European institutions to adopt a new instrument to rectify the situation.

== Similar systems ==
The possibility to ask for a preliminary ruling is also embedded in other legal systems:

- The courts of Belgium, the Netherlands and Luxembourg may ask "questions regarding the interpretation of the law" to the Benelux Court of Justice regarding certain Benelux conventions and regulations.
- Iceland, Liechtenstein and Norway may request the EFTA Court of Justice for an advisory opinion regarding the interpretation of the European Economic Area Agreement, as well as EU regulations that apply to those states.

== See also ==
- Reference question, submission by the federal or a provincial government under Canadian law
