= Gustavsburg (Jägersburg) =

Baroque-style castle in Germany

- Jägersburg ( Homburg ) in Germany
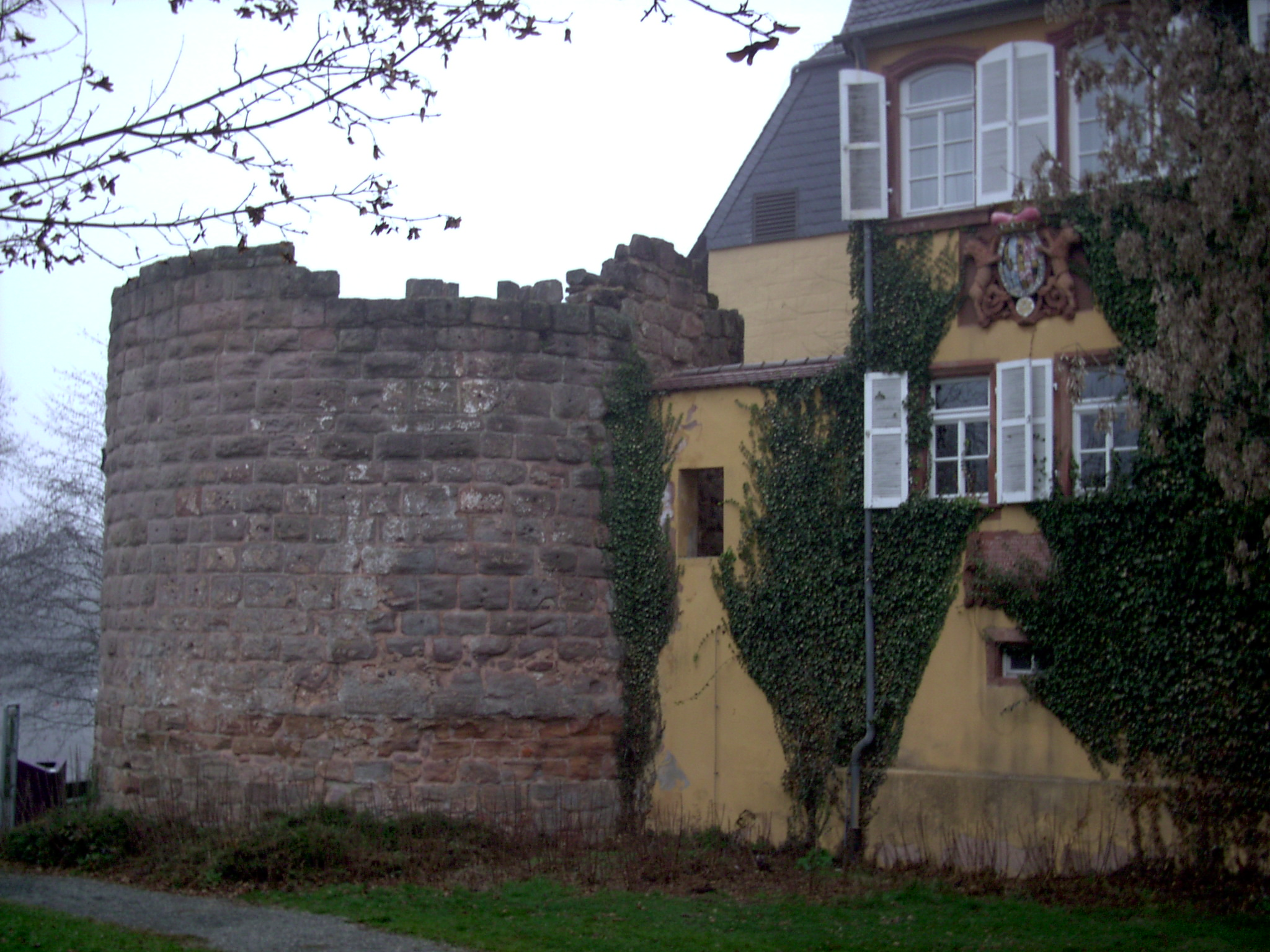

Site information
- Condition: Restored perimeter walls

Location
- Coordinates: 49.370556°N 7.321389°E

Site history
- Built: 13th to 14th Century

Gustavsburg is a Baroque building designed by the Swedish architect Jonas Erikson Sundahl in the Saar-Palatinate town of Jägersburg. The structure was originally called Hattweiler Castle, was renamed Hansweiler Castle in 1590, and finally Gustavsburg in 1720. It is located in the center of Jägersburg, directly adjacent to the 1.7 hectare castle pond.

== History ==
Remnants of the building structure reveal that the complex was originally a Salian border castle, which was destroyed by Barbarossa around 1168 and then rebuilt as a Hohenstaufen castle.

After the decline of the Hohenstaufen dynasty, the castle (called Hattweiler Castle) fell to the Counts of Zweibrücken. A vassal of Zweibrücken, Bartholomäus von Hattweiler, is first mentioned in 1272. His successors were Waitier von Hattweiler (1282) and Thielemann von Hattweiler (1318). In 1402, the castle was pledged to Philip of Nassau-Saarbrücken. Elisabeth of Nassau-Saarbrücken liked the castle so much that she changed the name Hautefeuille to Hattweiler in the formerly French love song, which she incorporated into the Moselle Franconian chivalric romance "Sibille." Other illustrious names such as Hermann Boos von Waldeck, Anselm von Bitsch and Symont Mauchenheimer, Hans Ryten Esel von Ruschenburg, Alheim Eckbrecht von Dürckheim, Albrecht von Morsheim, and Philipp Breder von Hohenstein subsequently held the castle.

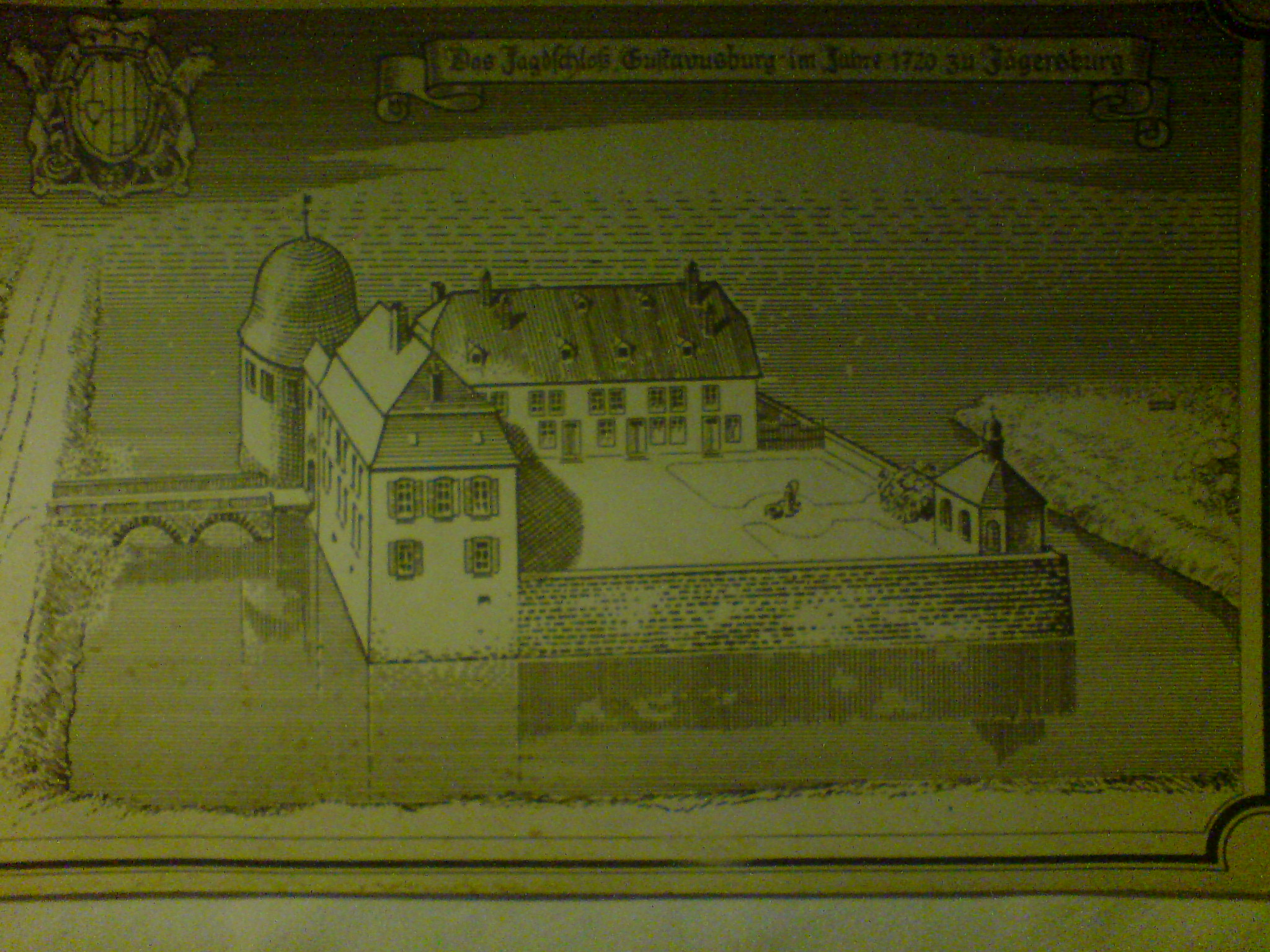
The moated castle around 1720

During the war between Franz von Sickingen and Archbishop Richard von Greiffenklau of Trier (1522), the castle fell to the Trier forces, and the owner of Hohenstein was imprisoned in Wittlich. His sons regained the castle 20 years later (1543) and passed it on to Friedrich von Steinkallenfels. He sold it to Johann von Warsberg, who in turn sold it to Count John I of Palatinate-Zweibrücken, who converted it into a palace in 1590. In 1622, a watchtower was added to the complex. The palace burned down during the Thirty Years' War. In 1666, Duke Friedrich Ludwig had a residential building with a barn and stables built in its place. In 1720, Duke Gustav Samuel Leopold had the residential building renovated by Sundahl in the Baroque style and added a chapel, renaming the complex Gustavsburg after himself. After the French Revolution, Gustavsburg Castle came into the possession of forester Christian Lindemann, then in 1842 into the possession of the Bavarian Forestry Administration, before being taken over by the municipality of Jägersburg in 1973. From 1978 to 1981,the city of Homburg had Gustavsburg restored with subsidies from Saarland.

== Architecture ==
Gustavsburg is a Baroque building designed by the Swedish architect Jonas Erikson Sundahl. It has a fairly wide moat, fed by the Erbach stream, and the castle pond protected both the medieval moated castle and the subsequent castle buildings.

=== The medieval castle ===
Very few structural elements of the medieval complex survive due to destruction, but especially due to the alterations and new constructions of the 16th and 17th centuries. The remains of a stump of a large round tower are the only visible evidence of the medieval structure. This tower, likely part of the original 13th-14th century structure, underwent various, sometimes significant, alterations up until the Baroque period. The outer diameter of the preserved ground floor of the tower is 8.50 meters. Inside, it features a vaulted room, which is labeled "Prison ou Cave" (Prison or Cave) on a plan from 1721.

=== The Hansweiler Castle ===
In contrast to the medieval castle, the construction history of Hansweiler Castle is clearly documented from the 16th century onwards. In 1594, when Sigmund Gentersberger was master builder, damage caused by Baden soldiers was repaired. The moat, the curtain wall, and a barbican are explicitly mentioned, as are a barn and a horse hayrack.

There was also mention of the “Great Oriel Room”, a formal upper-floor room with a large projecting window that served both a functional (light/view) and ornamental purpose, the ladies' chamber, a fireplace room, a kitchen, a chancery, a cellar room, a stable, and a spiral staircase.

Numerous construction projects are also documented during the Thirty Years' War: in 1622 the main tower was rebuilt, in 1623 a gate and a new building were added, in 1632/33 a roundel was erected and finally in 1639 the ring wall was reinforced with bastions.

=== Gustavsburg Castle ===
The successor to Hattweiler Castle and Hansweiler Palace, was commissioned by Duke Samuel Leopold of Zweibrücken. The Swedish architect Jonas Erickson Sundahl incorporated the buildings erected in 1666 on the site of the burned-down palace, which were already in very poor condition at the beginning of the 18th century. These buildings were restored in 1721 in the form that is still visible today. The two-storey main residential building was erected in 1721. The service buildings lie almost at a right angle to the main building, and is of half-timbered construction. In 1720, a chapel dedicated to St. Hubertus was built at the northeastern corner of the old turret ring.

== Photos ==
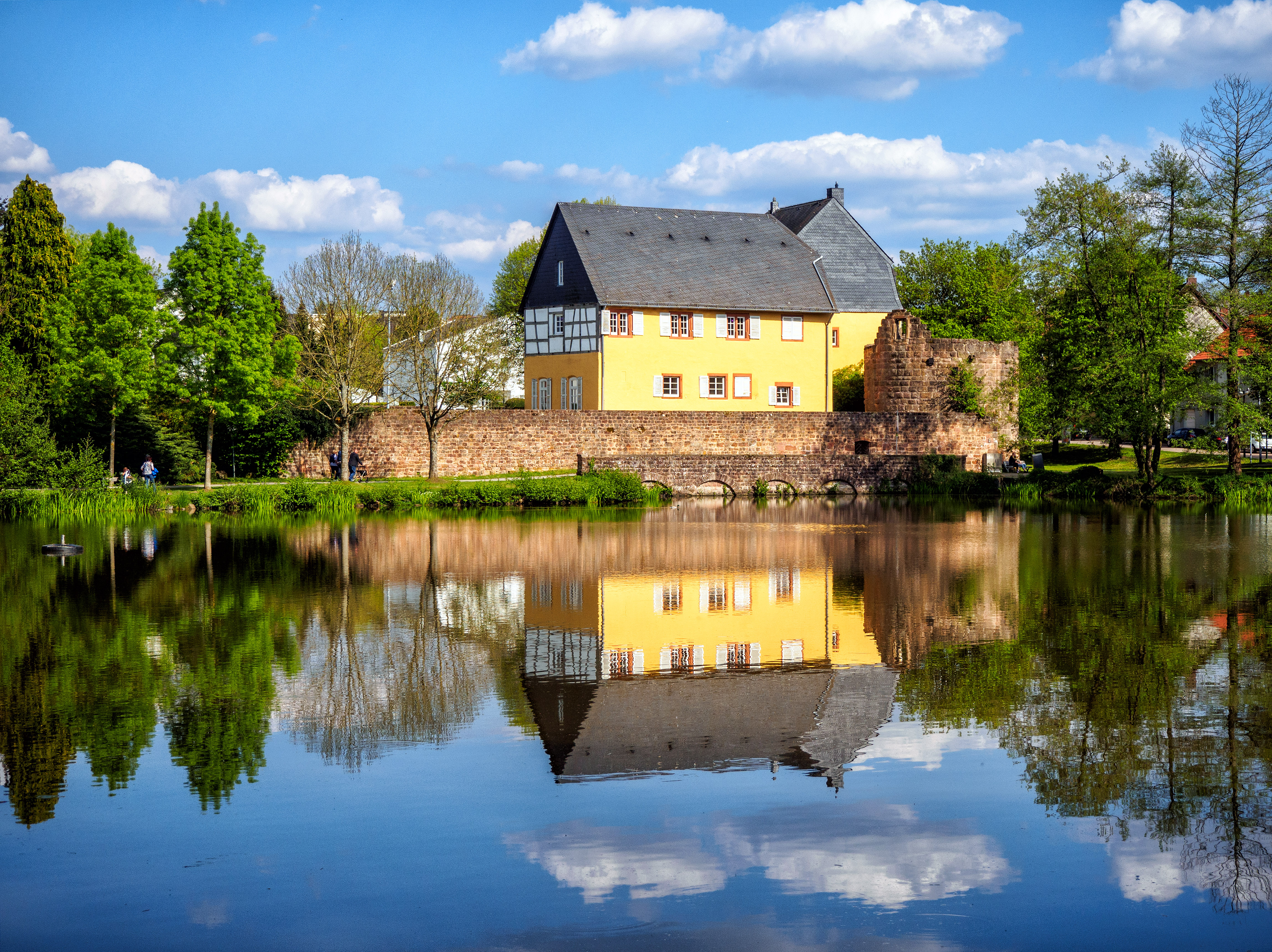
Gustavsburg as seen from the castle pond

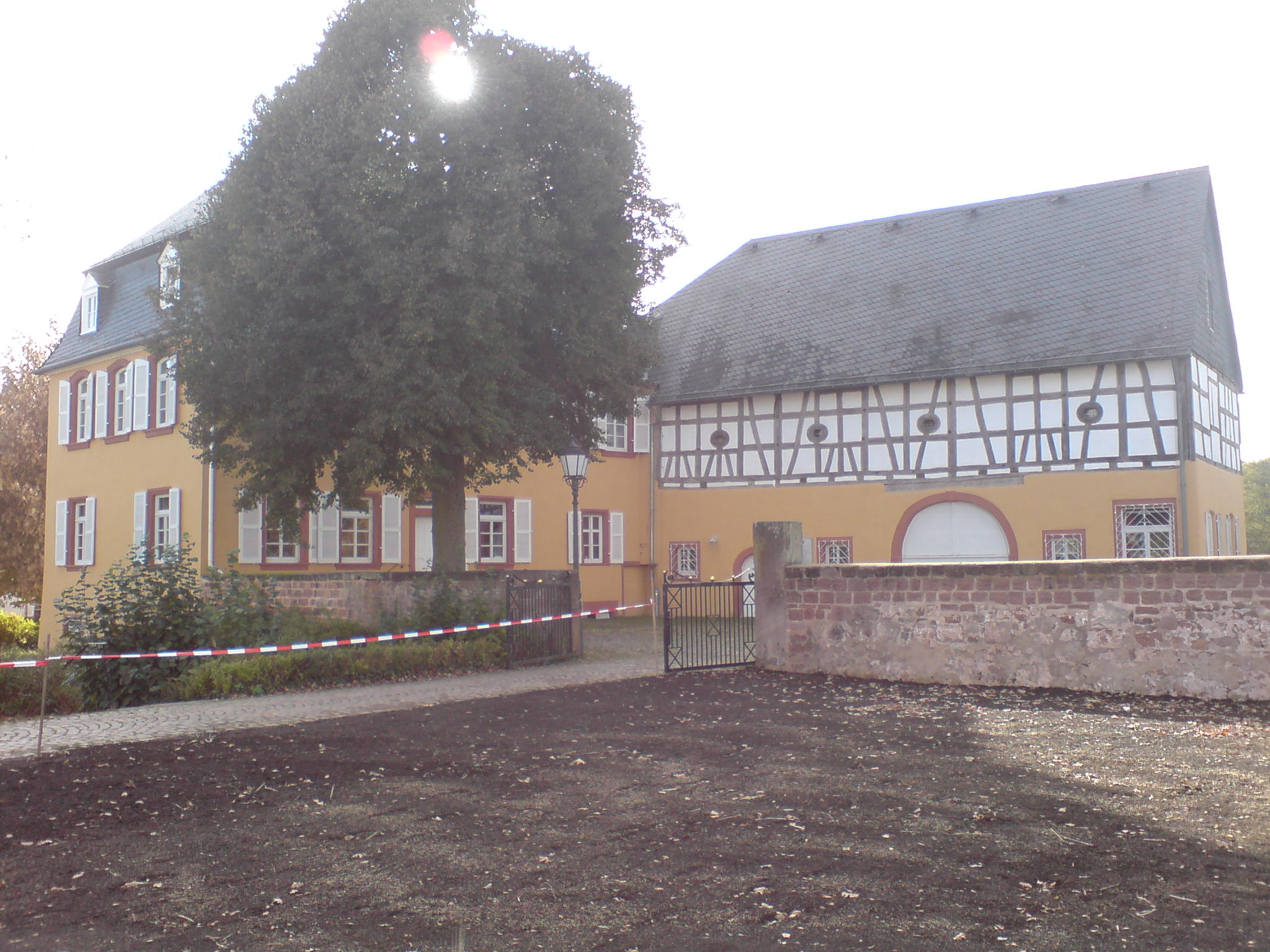
The inner courtyard of Gustavsburg

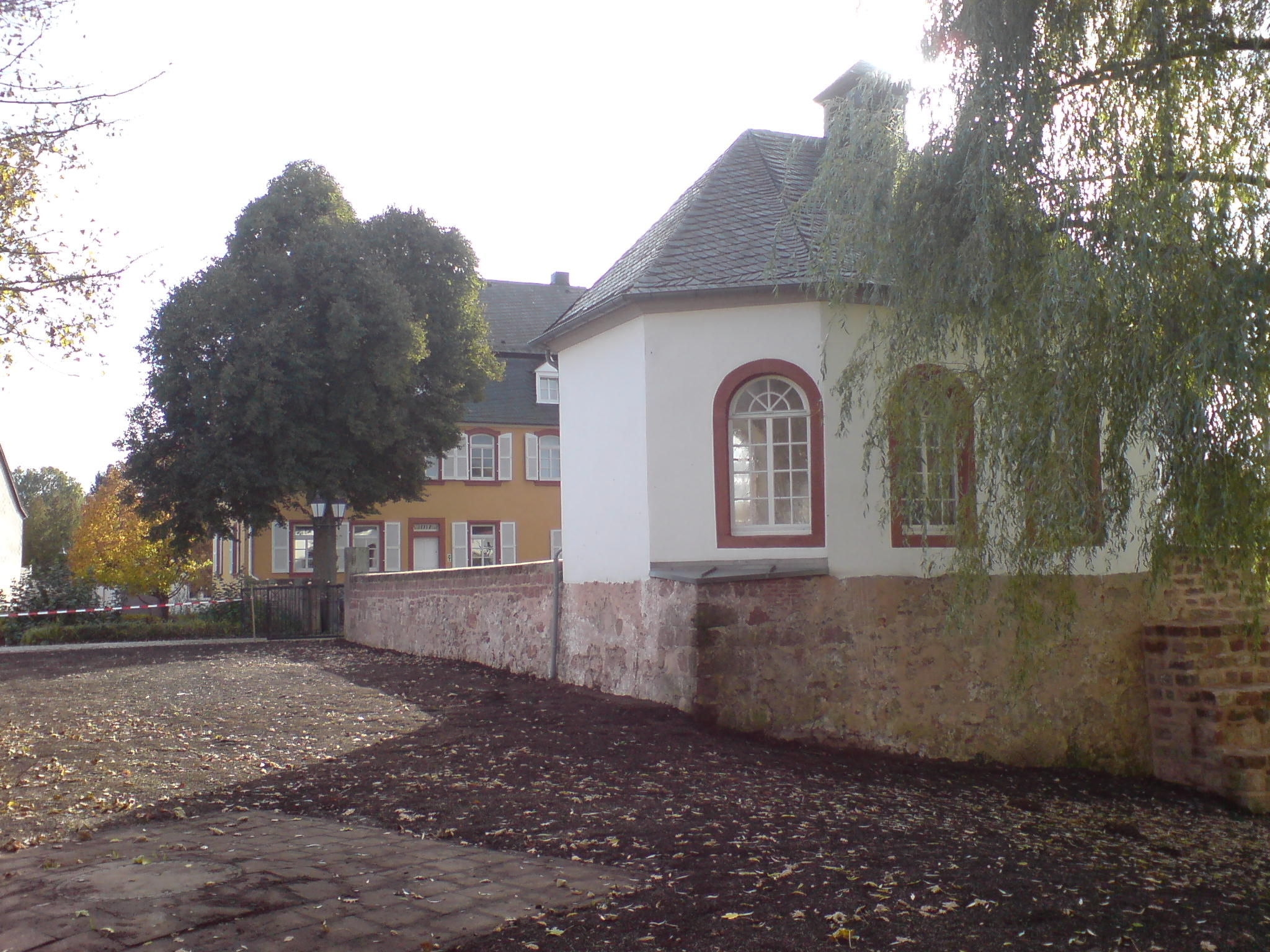
The chapel of Gustavsburg

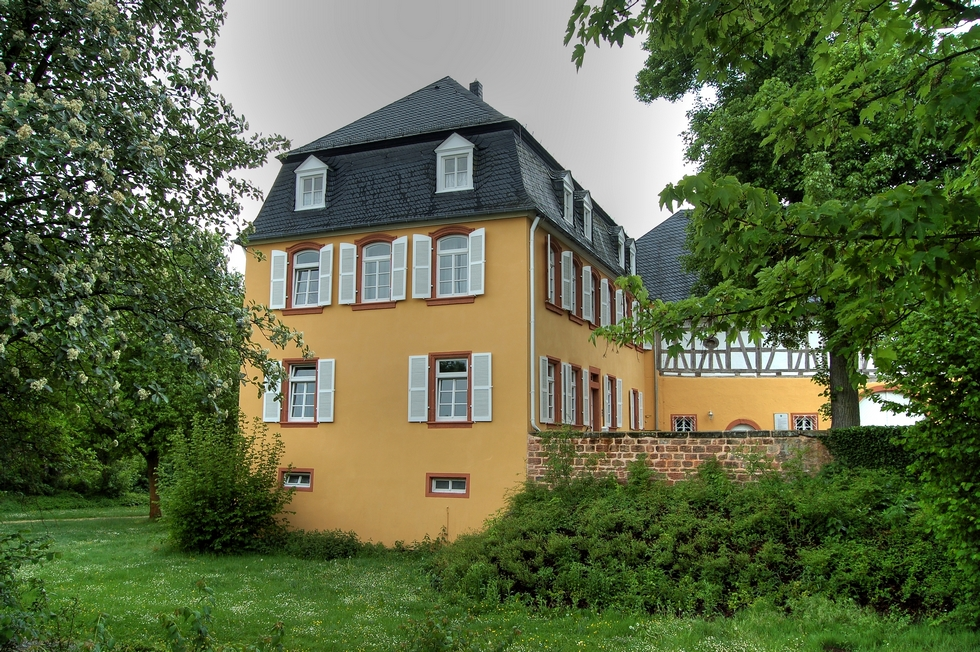
Building view

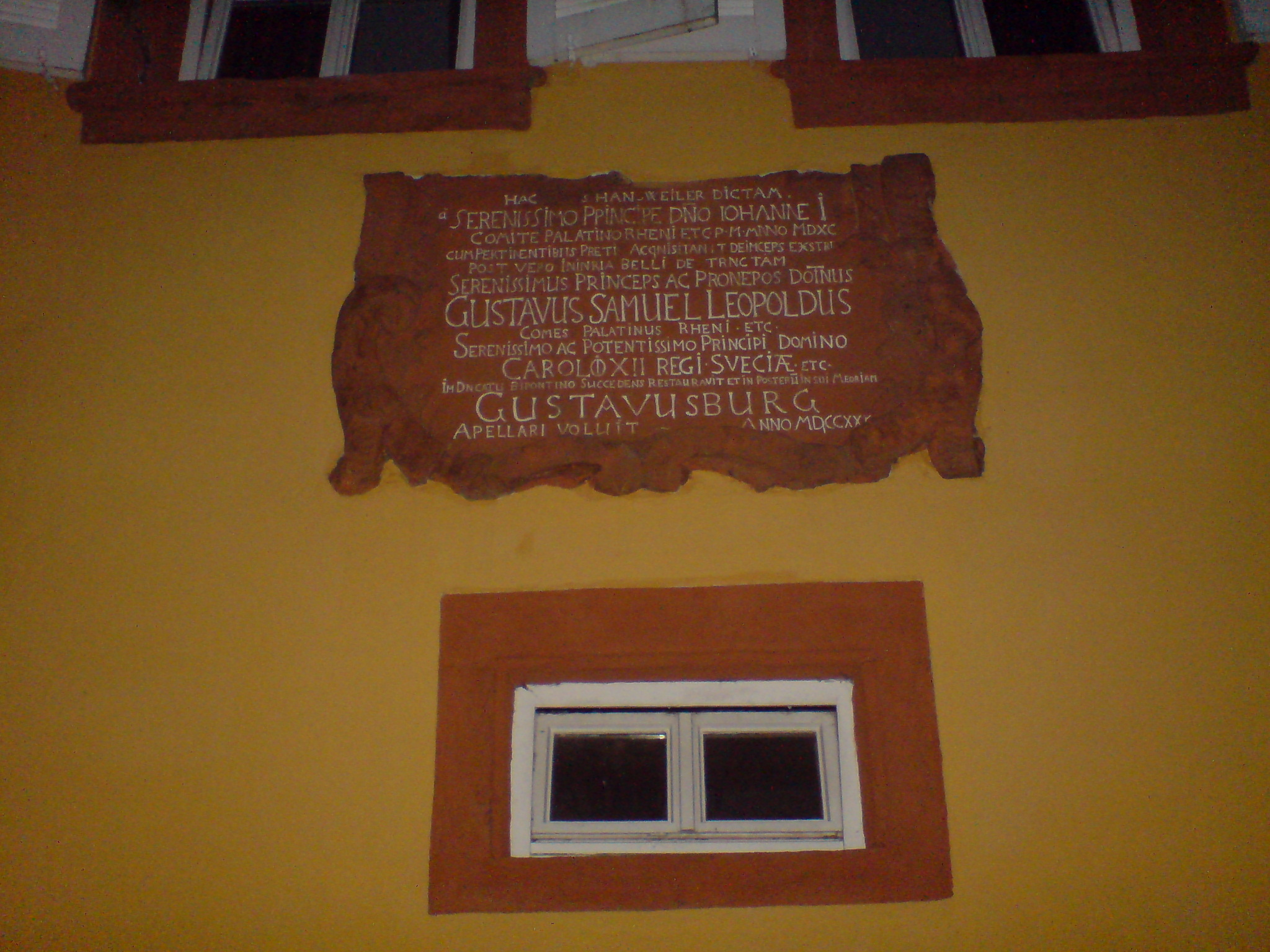
Inscription on the castle wall

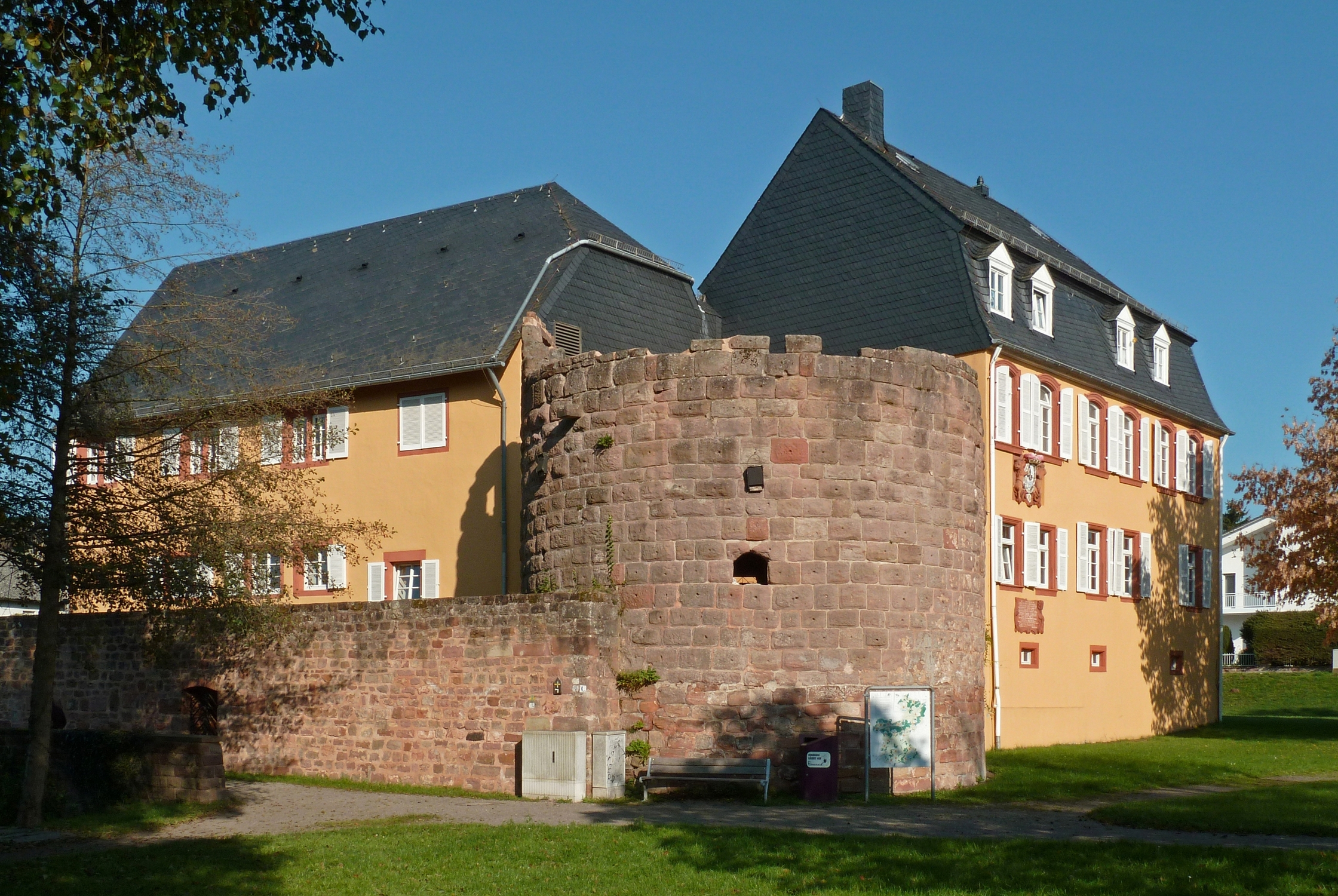
Side view of Gustavsburg

== Present day ==
The castle is owned by the city of Homburg and houses the Jägersburg Castle and Palace Museum. The hall on the upper floor is available for exhibitions, concerts, and celebrations. The chapel and the ballroom are popular choices for weddings.

The main collection focuses on the Dukes of Zweibrücken, who ruled over the town and surrounding area. Replicas from the Greinberg collection, featuring nearly all the portraits of the dukes, are displayed alongside works by other Zweibrücken artists, including Ziesenis and Mannlich. These rooms highlight the town's role as a place of leisure, a function it has served for the rulers since the 15th century.
