= Anna Geiger =

Anna Geiger may refer to:

- Anna Bella Geiger (born 1933), Brazilian artist
- Anna Margarethe Geiger (1783–1809), German pastellist
