= Schwarzenacker Roman Museum =

Coordinates: 49°16′58″N 7°19′00″E

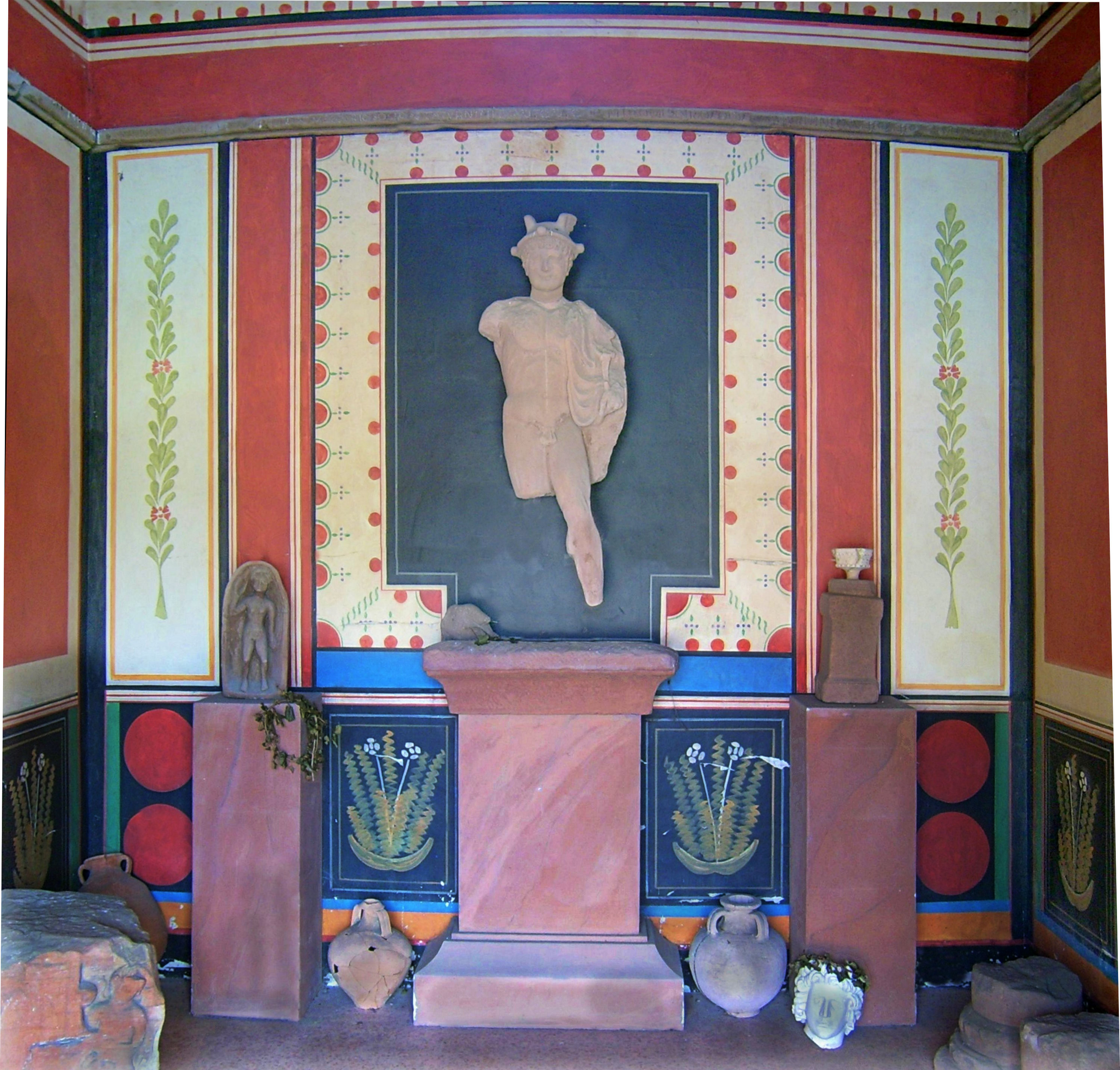
Interior of the Gallo-Roman Temple, Schwartzenacker

Römermuseum Schwarzenacker (Schwarzenacker Roman Museum) is an archaeological open-air museum in Schwarzenacker, a district of Homburg, Saarland, Germany. The museum was constructed by archaeologist Alfonso Kolling, who also led the archaeological excavations at the site. The current director is Klaus Kell.

== Exhibits ==
The Museum shows the remains of a Roman vicus (country town) of approximately 2000 inhabitants which existed from the time of the birth of Christ until its destruction by the Alemanni in 275 A.D. Visitors can view the excavated buildings, grounds, roads and culverts.

In the adjoining 18th century villa and the reconstructed houses of the vicus important finds from the everyday life of the Roman population are exhibited, found either at the settlement itself or in the surrounding area. At the front steps of the villa stand life-size replicas of Roman equestrian statues which were discovered in 1887 in nearby Breitfurt. The originals stood for many years at the entrance of the Historical Museum of the Palatinate in Speyer, but they were removed and placed in the courtyard of the museum under a canopy, since they were heavily weathered due to environmental factors.

== Villa ==
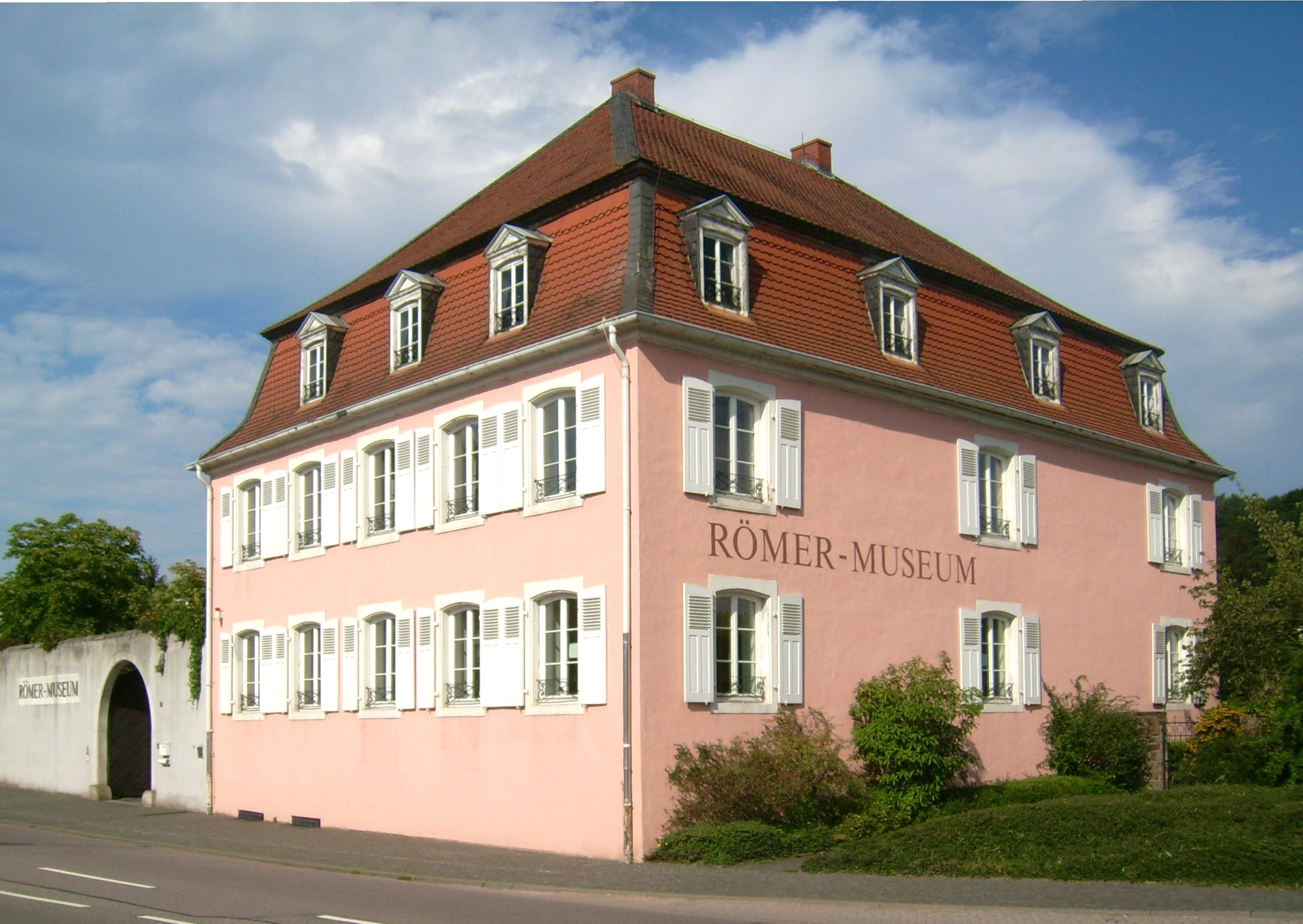
Schwartzenacker Villa

The early 18th Century (c. 1725) villa was designed by Jonas Erikson Sundahl. Besides the Roman exhibits, the villa also contains paintings by Johann Christian von Mannlich and other period painters of the region. The villa has a landscaped garden in the Baroque style, which was created following the excavation of the vicus.
