= Karlsberg Castle =

Castle ruin in Germany

Coordinates: 49°19′13″N 07°20′38″E

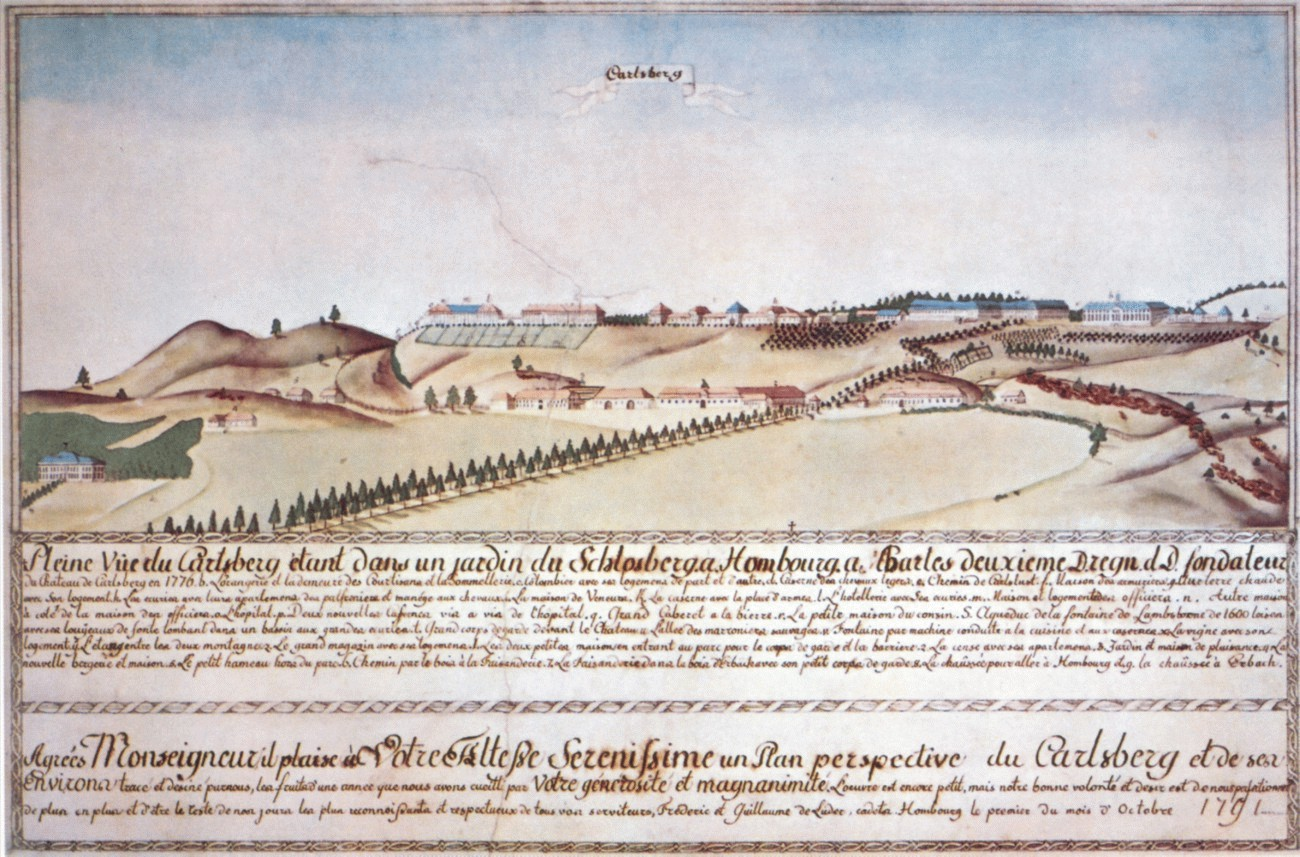

Karlsberg Castle (German: Schloss Karlsberg) is a castle ruin on Buchenberg east of Homburg in Saarland, Germany. The castle was constructed from 1778 to 1788 in Baroque and Classical style by Johann Christian von Mannlich, architect and general building director of the dukes of Zweibrücken, by order of Charles II August, Duke of Zweibrücken. The castle was the largest country palace of Europe and served as the residence of the Duke of Zweibrücken. In 1793 the castle was destroyed by French revolutionary troops.

== Historical situation ==
Charles II August was the son of the (titular) Count Palatine and prince of Palatinate-Zweibrücken and Palatinate-Birkenfeld-Bischweiler Frederick Michael. This means, his father was the head of the house Palatinate-Birkenfeld-Bischweiler, a side branch of the house Palatinate-Zweibrücken-Birkenfeld, which was a side branch of the ducal house of Palatinate-Zweibrücken, which itself was a side branch of the house of Wittelsbach-Palatinate, which held the title of elector Palatinate of the Rhine and was the Protestant branch of the house of Wittelsbach.

His upbringing as the son of an unimportant poor prince did not give Charles II August the chance to build a castle of European standing. It was the extinction of the three main branches of the house of Wittelsbach, which gave him the opportunity to do so. In 1775 Christian IV, duke of Zweibrücken died without legitimate children. Charles August became his successor. At the same time, neither Charles Theodore, Elector of Bavaria, Elector Palatine, the head of the Protestant main branch of the house of Wittelsbach, nor Maximilian III Joseph, Elector of Bavaria, the head of the Catholic main branch of the house of Wittelsbach, had surviving legitimate children. So Charles August was expected to succeed these relatives too.

Charles Theodore was not interested in the Bavarian inheritance (because of their illegitimate birth, his own children would not benefit from the inheritance). Therefore, he was willing to sell his hereditary title and, after the death of Maximilian Joseph, his Bavarian property to the Austrian house of Habsburg.

The European powers, especially Prussia, were not interested in seeing the house of Habsburg make further land gains. The only way to prevent this from happening was to make sure that, instead of selling his own hereditary title too, Charles August protested against every attempt to impede his succession to the Bavarian throne. To insure this, Charles August received financial support from European powers such as France and Prussia. Part of the demonstration of his position as the inheritor of the Electorate of the Palatinate and Bavaria was an extensive holding of court.

== Construction ==
Architect of the castle was Johann Christian von Mannlich, painter and architect, who held the office general building director of the duke of Zweibrücken.

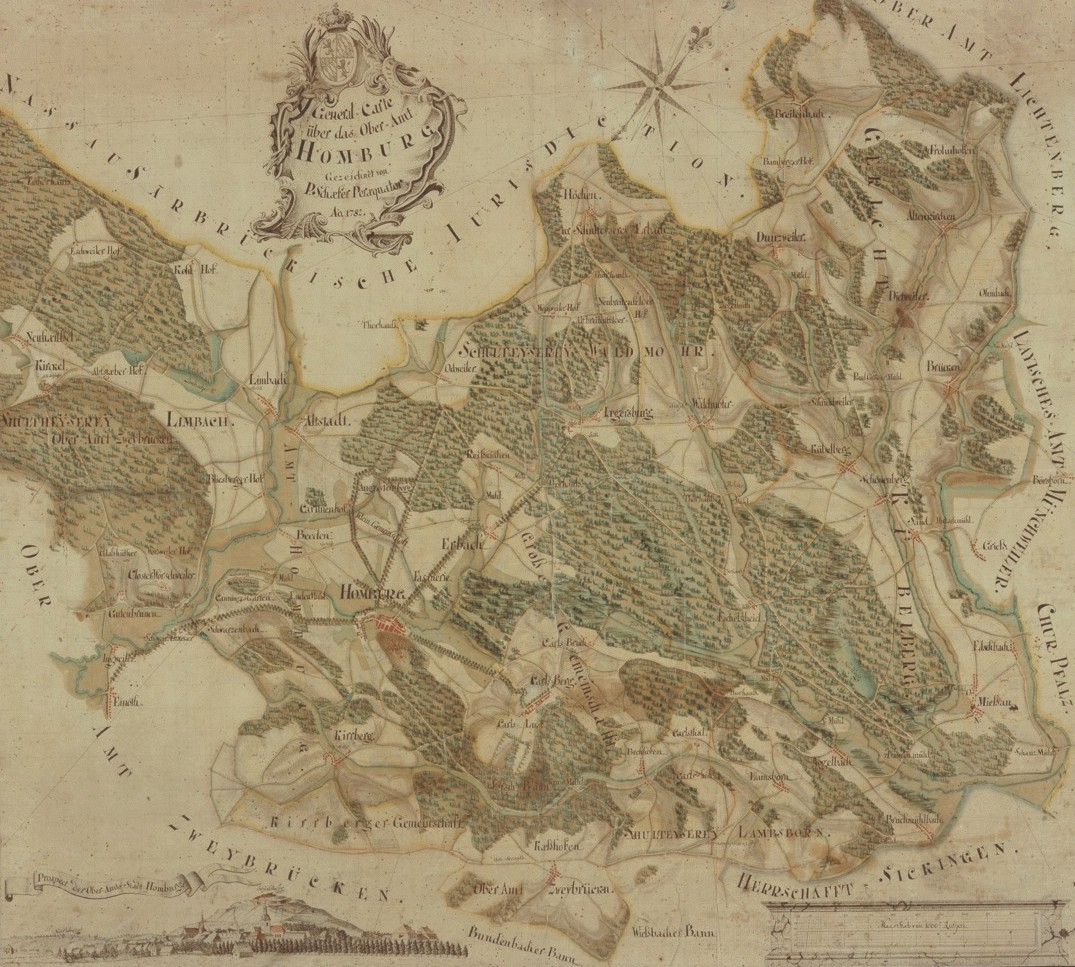

In 1760 the Baron of Closen built a house, called Luisenhof (Louise grange) after his wife Louise von Closen (born von Esebeck), on the Buchenberg. When he died, the estate was inherited by his widow.

On 27 July 1777 duke Charles II August bought the Luisenhof for the price of 23,000 gulden (a journeyman had to work two days to earn one Gulden) and 60 new Louis d'or (about twice the worth of a gulden). He was influenced by his mistress, Caroline von Esebeck, a cousin of the owner, who was seeking to sell the property she did not use any more, because she lived with her new husband, the count of Strahlenheim-Wasaburg in Forbach.

From 1778 to 1788, a castle was constructed on the area of the Louisenhof. Leading architect was Johann Christian von Mannlich (born 2 October 1741, Strasbourg; died 3 January 1822, Munich), a painter and architect, who became court painter and general building director of the duke of Zweibrücken.

The castle was constructed in the style of classicism. It was one of the first buildings within the Holy Roman Empire constructed in this new style.

The main entrance was located in the valley in front of the castle. There the Karlsberger Hof (Karlsberg grange), a farm building, was constructed. This is the only building of the castle complex that is still intact. From there, a meandering road led to the mansion, a three winged building, arranged around a court of honour.

The main buildings were constructed along the edge of a hill, giving a view over the surrounding countryside.

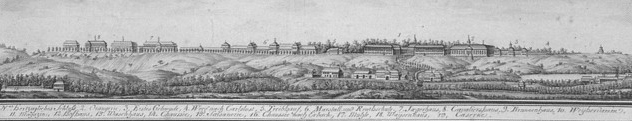
In 1778 the construction of the first buildings began. Several buildings were constructed at the same time.

=== Timetable ===
1778 - 1780 well and water conduits

1778 - 1782 corps de logis, tavern and brewery
1778 - 1785 stables
1779 - 1785 cavaliers house
1779 - 1783 Dutch nursery and greenhouses
1779 - 1794 northern wing of the mansion
1779 - 1782 dovecote
1779 - 1786 menagerie
1779 - 1780 Tschifflik pavilion
1779 - 1784 construction of the kitchen wing
1780 - 1785 southern wing of the mansion
1780 - 1783 chinoisierie
1780 conversion of the creamery to an orangery
1780 - 1783 kennel
1780 - 1784 hunter's lodge, from 1791 barracks
1780 - 1782 court nursery

1780 - 1781 pheasant house
1780 - 1784 big cascade and higher pool
1781 pineapple greenhouse
1781 - 1782 kitchen wing
1782 amphitheater
1782 beginning of the construction of the western wing
1782-85 depots
1782 gate lodge
1783 comedians house
1783 fountain house Hischwürzloch
1783 beehouse
1783-84 pleasure house of the prince
1784 pleasure garden of the duchess
1785 rotunda (on occasion of the marriage of the Count Palatine Maximilian Joseph)
1788 gallery wing

In 1779 the castle became the residence of the dukedom. The castle was more than just a mansion with a garden, connected, to it. In addition to the mansion itself, there was a full functional small village with barracks, farms, nurseries, kennels and stables.

== Description ==
=== The buildings ===
==== Exterior ====
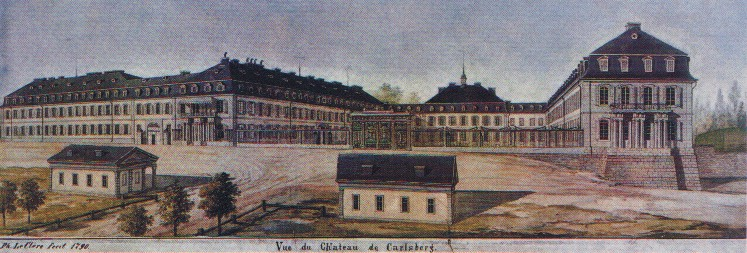

The buildings were constructed in a very plain style. The uniform design of the one and two storied buildings includes continuous cornices and architrave blocks and gabled roofs. Only the buildings of the Corps de logis have a mansard roof. The buildings only impress by their size. The right side of the main complex of buildings has a length of 1,250 meters, thus creating the largest country palace of Europe.

===== Corps de logis =====
With 42 meters, the staircase was one of the biggest of the Baroque period.

In the upper floor, the state rooms could be found.

==== Interior ====
===== General =====
Main parts of the equipment of the castle were created by purveyors to the French court. Other parts came from older castles of the dukes of Zweibrücken.

Most of the elaborate carved and gilded furnitures and plankings were created by the French court cabinetmaker Georges Jacob gefertigt. Sculptures were produced by the French sculptors Francois-Joseph Duret and Martin-Claude Monot. The silverware was created by Jean-Jacques Kirstein in Strassburg and the drapery came from Lyon. The equipment followed the plans of Johann Christian von Mannlich und Jean-Démosthène Dugourc.

===== Corps de logis =====
The main piece of the show bedroom was a bed "à la Romaine", which was the archetype of following furniture of the kings of France. Main parts of the furnitures of this room can be found at the Munich residence and Berchtesgaden castle.

=== The garden ===
The garden has three parts, the park nearby the mansion, Karlslust (Charles' pleasure) and Hirschwürzloch.

The park near the mansion is a baroque style; Karlslust and Hirschwürzlust are English parks. It is not known who created the gardens. It looks like Mannlich worked on the plans but Friedrich Ludwig von Sckell did as well.

The court gardener, Johann Ludwig Petri, who created important parts of the park of Schwetzingen castle, seems to have been involved too. Other court gardeners were Ernst August Bernhard Petri, Bernhard Petri and Matthias Sckell.

== Destruction ==
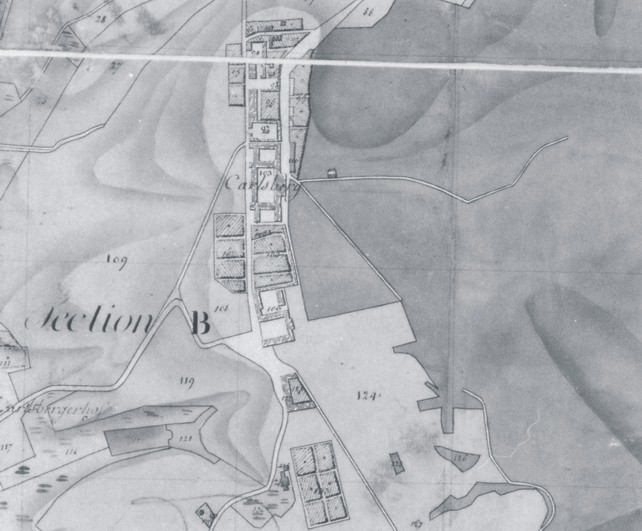

After the outbreak of the French revolution and the begin of the first coalition war (1792–1797), the duke held a neutral position in relation to the revolutionary government of France. The dukedom of Zweibrücken had a close relationship to France. There even served a Royal Deux-Ponts Regiment, within the French army, which participated in several battles, especially the siege of Yorktown, where they played a prominent part of taking redoubt 9. As compensation for this policy of neutrality, the duke was granted neutrality by the French government. Because of this guarantee, unlike other princes, the duke stayed within his dukedom, close to the French territory and the French armies. After the execution of Louis XVI, Charles II August was to be put on trial in front of a revolutionary tribunal, which would have meant his death. Before French troops could arrest him, he was warned by a nearby farmer and was able to escape to Mannheim, to live in his castles of Mannheim and Rohrbach near Heidelberg.

Within the next six months, French and Prussian troops alternately gained control of the region around the castle. Protected by the Prussian army, the equipment was transported to Mannheim too.

When the French troops capitulated in Mainz, the relief troops retired back home to France. Leaving the region, they marauded the castle and the residents of the nearby villages were allowed to plunder the buildings. On the eve of 28 July the French soldiers set fire to the main buildings. To be able to do so, about one hundred cartloads of straw had to be transported from Metz.

The fire did not destroy all of the buildings. The mansion was destroyed, but most of the service rooms and farming buildings were unaffected.

In the aftermath, the castle hill was still inhabited. In November 1793, there were still children born and documented in the church register. Until 1797, the court still settled accounts concerning the castle, although there were no real efforts to secure or maintain the buildings. Therefore, the buildings decayed even more. Napoleon returned the ruins to the duke's widow, under the condition that she remove all the ruins.

Parts of the furniture and equipment were auctioned off after the death of Charles II August. The rest was spread on several castles and museums of the house of Wittelsbach.

- The furniture was used in Nymphenburg castle, Berchtesgaden castle and the residences of Munich Würzburg and Bamberg.
- The collection of arms can be seen in the Historic Museum of the Palatinate, the German museum of hunting and fishing in Munich and Berchtesgaden castle.
- Parts of the silverware are located in the silver chamber of the Munich Rezidenz.
- The paintings formed the core of the Alte Pinakothek art collection.
- The graphic collection came to the state graphic collection in Munich.
- The coins were included in the state coin collection in Munich.
- The books now are part of the Bamberg State Library.

== Situation today ==
Today, only one building remains. The Karlsberger Hof, a former farmhouse near the main entrance of the castle territory. After serving for different purposes as a sugar factory or a forester's house, the Karsberger Hof is owned by the Karlsberg brewery.

Of the other buildings nothing remains, except parts of the foundations. Soon after the destruction, the hill was forested. Within this forest, there are some ponds, especially the Karlsberg weiher (Karlsberg pond), which are remains of water basins of the castle park.
