= Anna Margarethe Geiger =

German painter

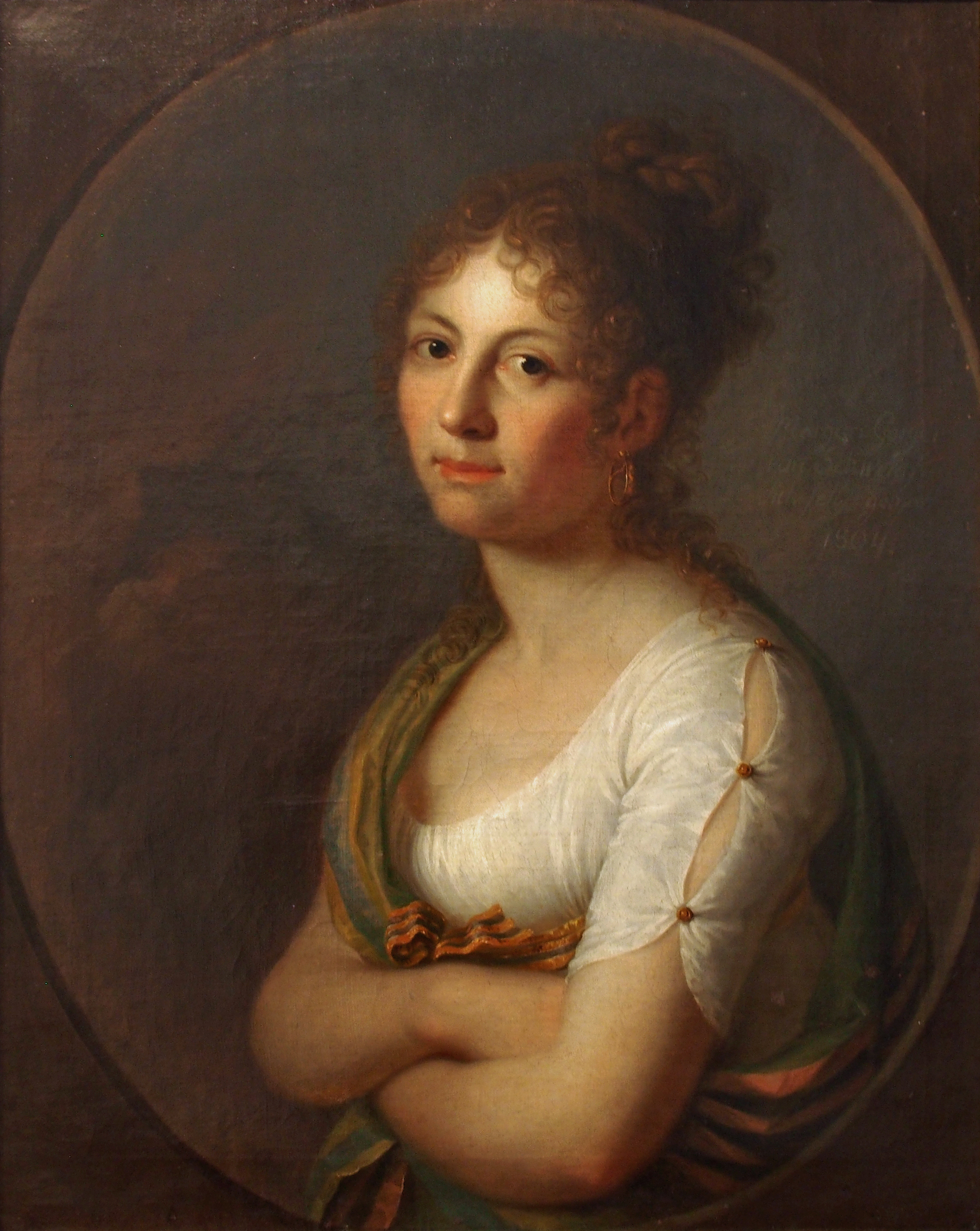
- Self-portrait Margarethe Geiger

Anna Margaretha Geiger (1783–1809) was a German pastellist. Her middle name is sometimes given as Margarete or Margareta.

Born in Schweinfurt, Geiger was the daughter of painter Conrad Geiger, and took lessons with Johann Christoph Fesel as well. In 1806 she went to Bamberg and Munich, and studied with Johann Christian von Mannlich. She settled in Munich, but upon her father's death her health began to fail and she soon died. A self-portrait of 1804 is in the collection of the Mainfränkisches Museum.
