= Tschifflik =

Coordinates: 49.2447°N 7.3943°E

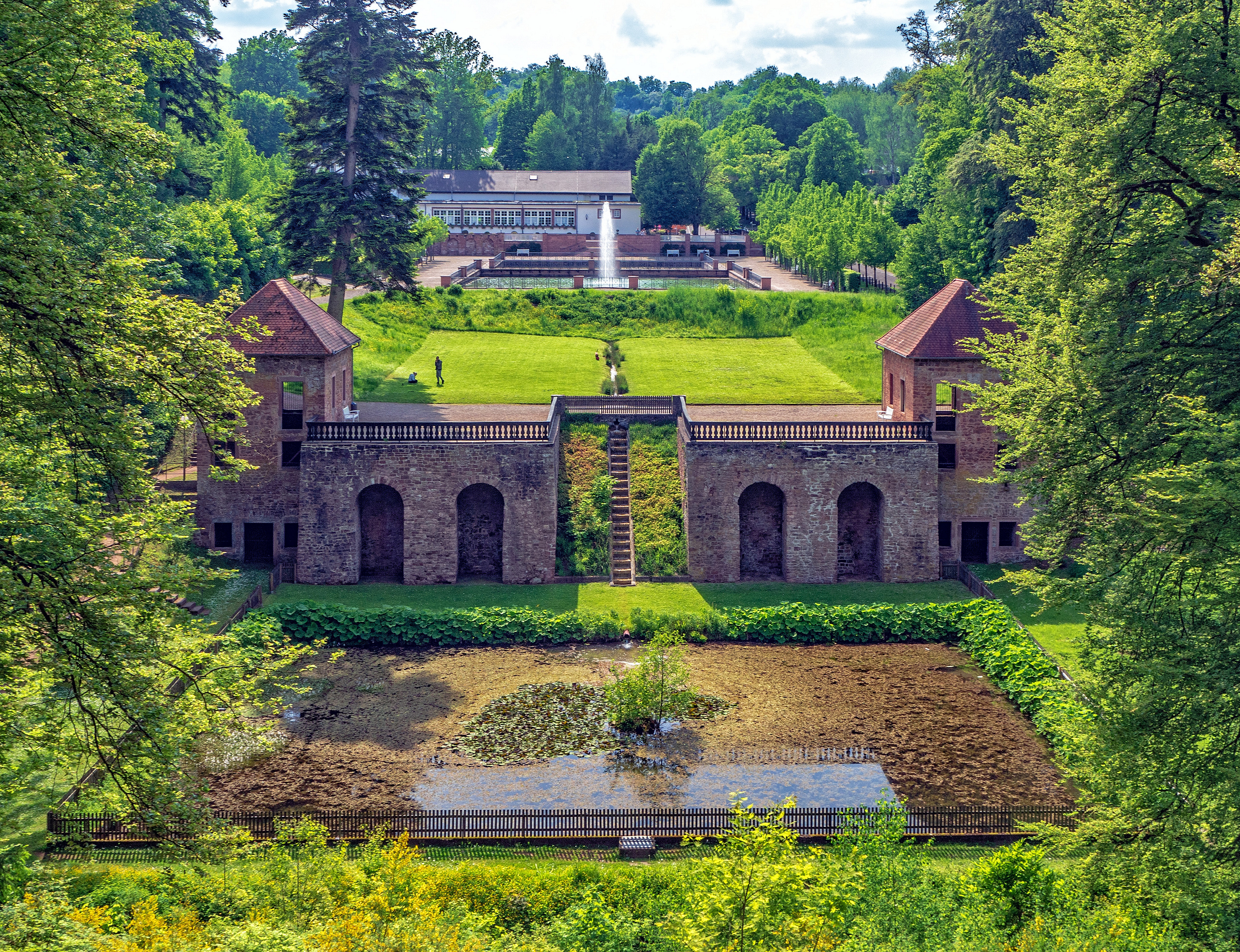
Lustschloss Tschifflik

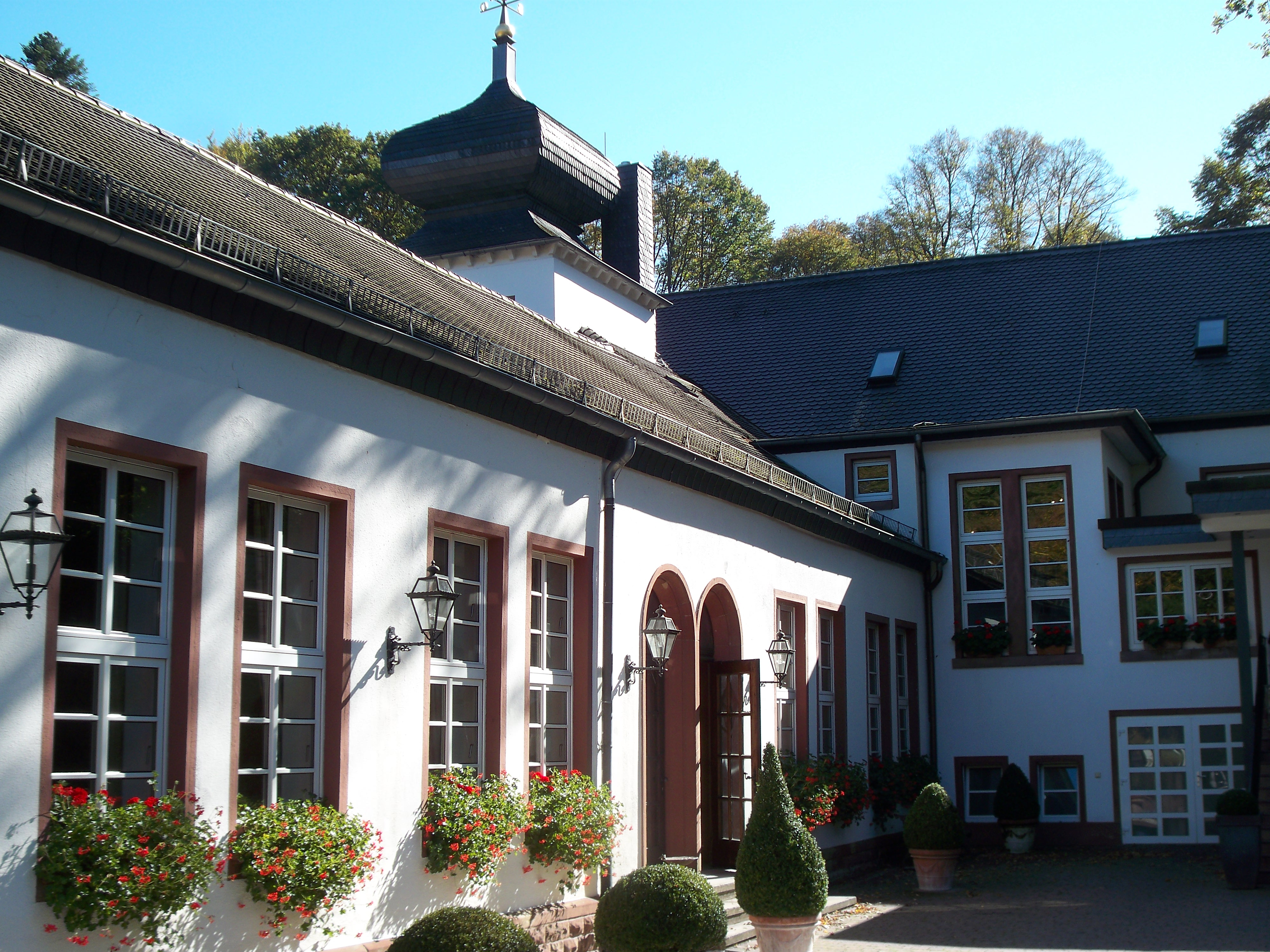
Hotel on the grounds of the castle

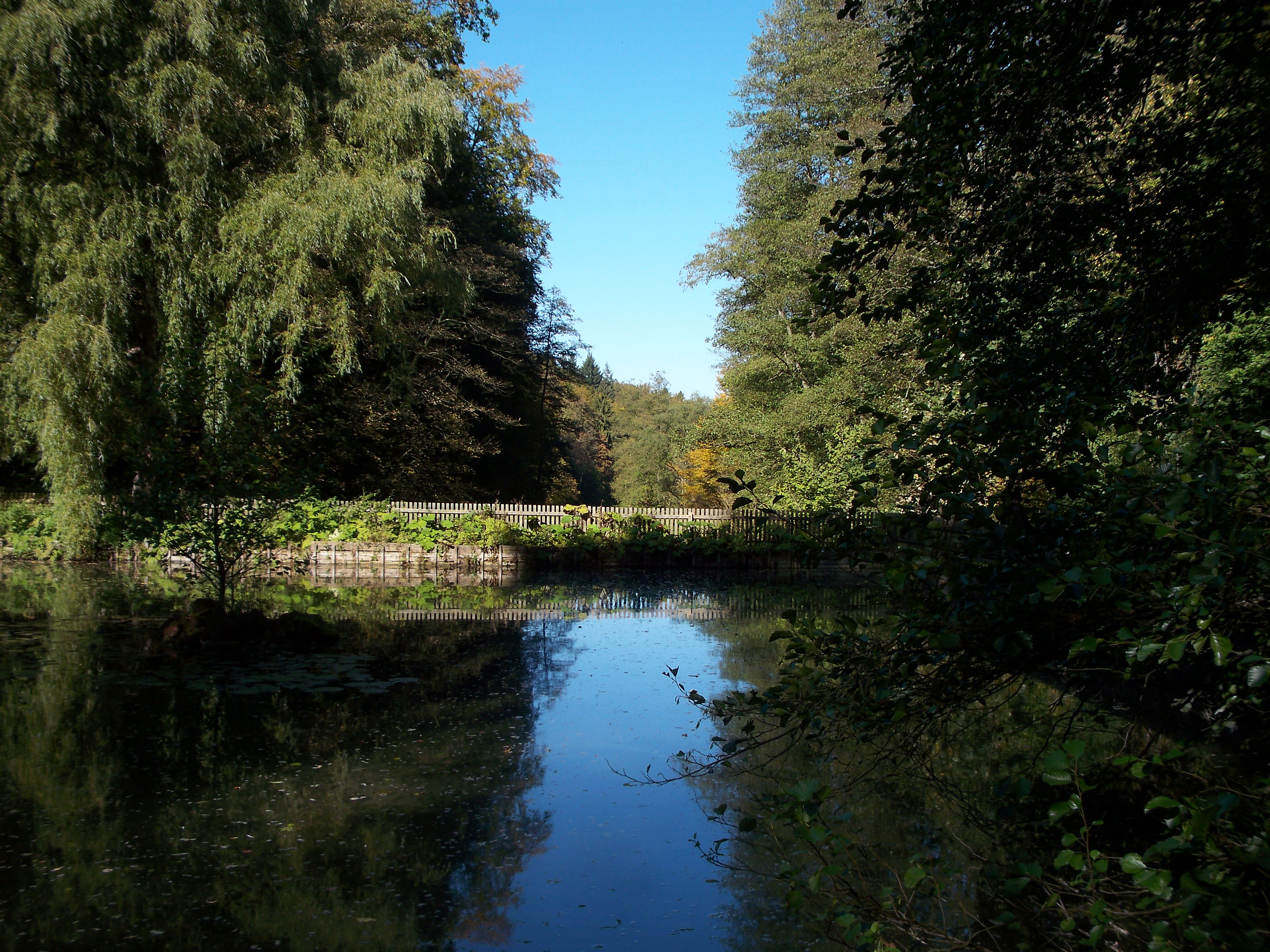
Water feature in Tschifflik

Tschifflik (Bulgarian: чифлик; Turkish: Çiftlik)– is a Lustschloss summer residence in Zweibrücken, constructed in 1715–1716 by exiled Polish King Stanisław Leszczyński according to a design by Jonas Erikson Sundahl. Tschifflik is an outstanding example of Baroque Landscape architecture. After being exiled from Poland, Leszczyński became the Count Palatine of Zweibrücken as a Prince exercising the head of state's authority on behalf of Charles XII in 1714. He continued in that role until 1719, a year after the Swedish monarch's death.

It is most commonly referred to as the Fasanerie by locals, the German term for the Pheasantry. The name refers to Duke Christian IV. After Stanislaus resettled in Nancy, France, many of the wooden buildings were cleared away. Duke Christian IV of Zweibrücken created a large pheasant garden in their place.

== Literature ==
- Max Hauttmann - Lustschloß Tschifflik bei Zweibrücken - 1919 - S. 54-58
- Jan Ostrowski - Tschifflik, maison de plaisance Stanisława Leszczyńskiego w Zweibrücken - "Kwartalnik Architektury i Urbanistyki" XVII wieku - 1972 s. 361-373
