= Johann Christian von Mannlich =

German painter and architect

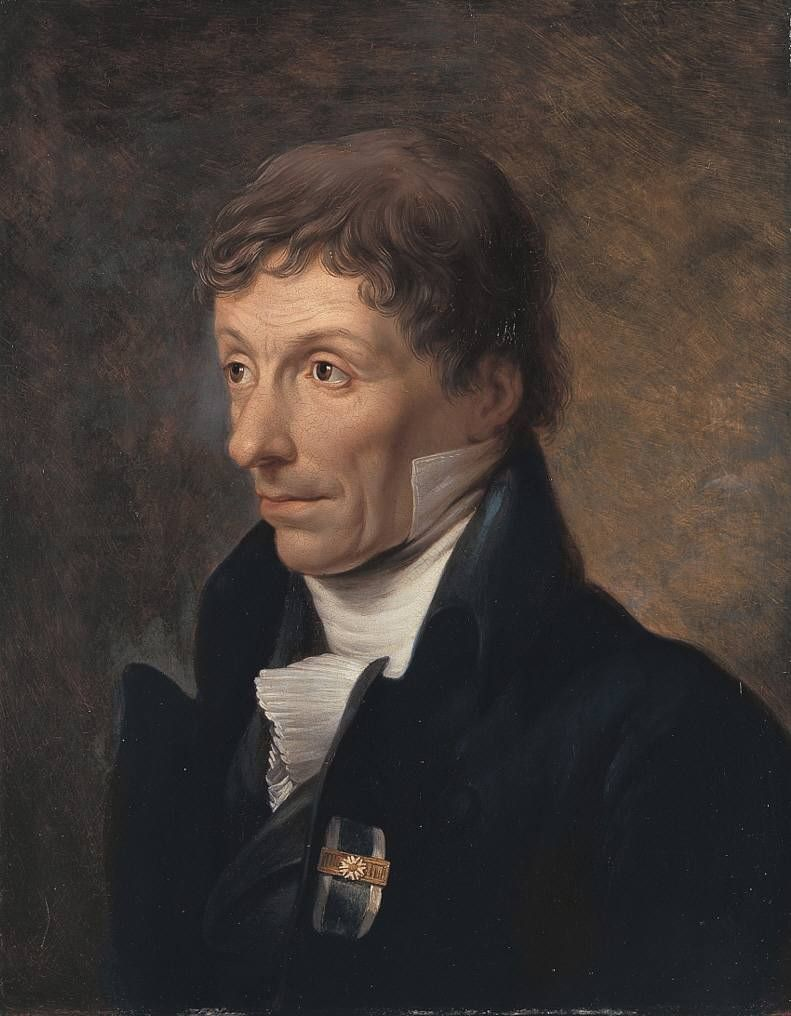
Portrait of Johann Christian von Mannlich by Johann Baptist Seele

Johann Christian von Mannlich (2 October 1741 – 3 January 1822) was a German painter and architect.

== Early life, family and education ==
Von Mannlich was born in Strasbourg in 1741, the son of Konrad von Mannlich, court painter to Christian IV, Duke of Zweibrücken. His initial training came from his father, after which he studied at the academy in Mannheim and in 1770 in Paris.

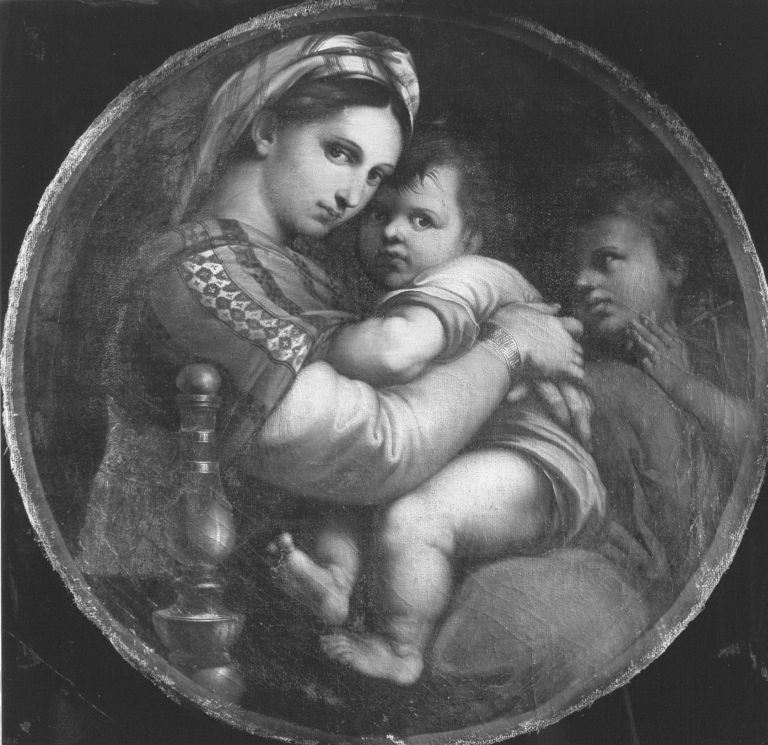
Madonna della Sedia (after Raphael) (1771)

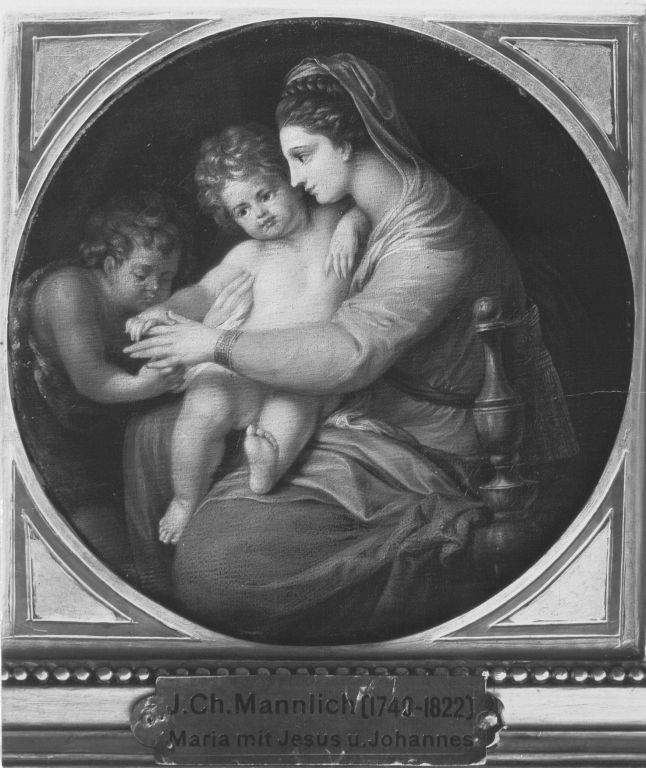
Madonna and Child with the Boy John (1770)

== Career ==
Johann succeeded his father in his court post.

Under Christian IV's successor, Charles II August, Duke of Zweibrücken, he was general director of buildings, in which capacity he was responsible for the design and construction of Schloss Karlsberg near Homburg, besides forming the duke's picture collection.

When the castle was destroyed by French Revolutionary forces on 28 July 1793, von Mannlich was able to rescue not only the picture collection but also the library and quantities of furniture, tapestries and other items. The picture collection eventually reached Munich via Mannheim, where it formed the basis of the collections of the Alte Pinakothek and where von Mannlich was the director of galleries for Maximilian I Joseph, King of Bavaria.

As a teacher, von Mannlich counted among his pupils the pastellist Anna Margarethe Geiger.

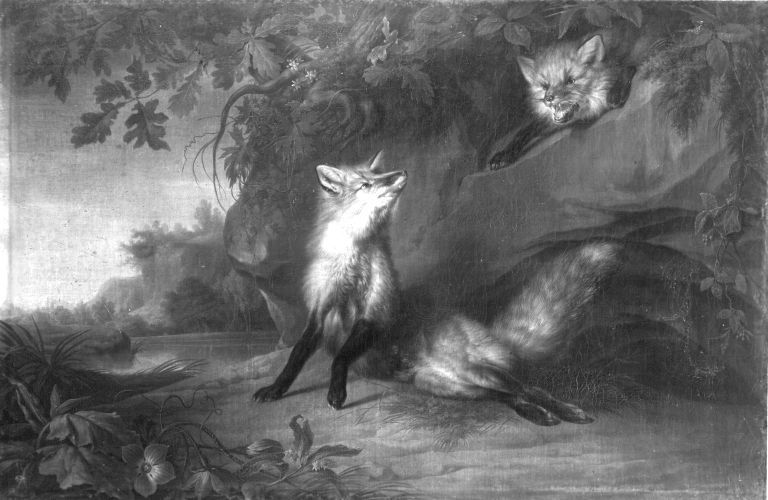
Two Canadian Foxes (1781)

== Personal life ==
He died in Munich on 3 January 1822.

== See also ==
- List of German painters
