= Jägersburg =

- Stadtteil of Homburg
- Coat of arms
- Interactive map of Jägersburg
- Location within Germany Location within Saarland
- Coordinates: 49°22′17″N 7°19′18″E
- Country: Germany
- State: Saarland
- District: Saarpfalz
- Municipality: Homburg

Population (2021)
  - Total: 3,088
- Time zone: UTC+01:00 (CET)
  - Summer (DST): UTC+02:00 (CEST)
- Postal codes: 66424
- Dialling codes: 06841
- Vehicle registration: HOM

Jägersburg (in Dialect Järschborch or Jächersburch) is a district of Homburg in the Saar-Palatinate (Saarpfalz) district, Germany. Until End 1973 was Jägersburg an independent municipality in the former Homburg district.

Jägersburg has many lakes and ponds. The 3 lakes are the Möhlwoog (7,4 ha), the Brückweiher (7,09 ha) and the Schloßweiher (Castle lake) (1,71 ha).

During the 18th century, Schloss Jägersburg was the favourite palace of Christian IV, Duke of Zweibrücken. However, today nothing remains anymore of these times.

== Geography ==
The districts Altbreitenfelderhof and Websweiler are parts of Jägersburg. As of 1 August 2021, the village Jägersburg has 2,704 inhabitants, Altbreitenfelderhof 115 and Websweiler 269.

== Transport ==
Jägersburg is served by the federal highway B 423. Jägersburg has an old train station.
