= Saint Charles =

Saint Charles may refer to:

== People ==
- Charles I, Count of Flanders (1084–1127), Blessed Charles the Good, count of Flanders, 1119–1127
- Charles, Duke of Brittany (1319–1364), Blessed Charles de Châtillon
- Charles Borromeo (1538–1584), cardinal and archbishop of Milan, 1564–1584
- Charles I of Austria (1887-1922), last Habsburg emperor
- Charles Spinola (1564–1622), Italian Jesuit missionary martyred in Japan
- King Charles the Martyr (1600–1649), Canonized Anglican Saint and martyr, king of England, Scotland, and Ireland, 1625–1649
- Charles Garnier (missionary) (1606–1649), French Jesuit missionary martyred in Canada
- Charles of Sezze (1613–1670), Italian friar of the Franciscan Order
- Charles-Joseph-Eugène de Mazenod (1782–1861), French Catholic clergyman
- Charles of Mount Argus (1821–1893), Dutch Passionist priest who worked in Ireland
- Charles Lwanga (1860 or 1865–1886), Ugandan Catholic martyr

== Places ==
=== Barbados ===
- Port Saint Charles, luxury marina within the parish of Saint Peter

=== Canada ===
- Saint-Charles Parish, New Brunswick
  - Saint-Charles, New Brunswick, an unincorporated community
- St. Charles, Ontario, town in the Sudbury District
- St. Charles, Winnipeg, city ward of Winnipeg, Manitoba
- Saint-Charles-Borromée, Quebec, city in the region of Lanaudière
- Saint-Charles-sur-Richelieu, Quebec, municipality in La Vallée-du-Richelieu Regional County Municipality
- Pointe-Saint-Charles, neighborhood in Le Sud-Ouest, Montreal, Quebec

=== France ===
- Saint-Charles-de-Percy, merged into Valdallière commune in Calvados department, Normandy region
- Marseille-Saint-Charles Station, main railway station and intercity bus station, Marseille, Bouches-du-Rhône

=== United States ===
- St. Charles, Arkansas, town in Arkansas County
- Saint Charles Reservoir, in Pueblo County, Colorado
- Saint Charles River, in Colorado
- Saint Charles, Georgia
- St. Charles, Idaho, city in Bear Lake County
- St. Charles, Illinois, city in DuPage and Kane counties
- St. Charles, Iowa, city in Madison County
- St. Charles, Kentucky, city in Hopkins County
- St. Charles Parish, Louisiana, parish in New Orleans metropolitan area
- St. Charles, Maryland, planned community in Charles County
- St. Charles, Michigan, village in Saginaw County
- St. Charles, Minnesota, city in Winona County
- St. Charles County, Missouri, county in eastern Missouri
  - St. Charles, Missouri, city and county seat
- Saint Charles, Ohio, unincorporated community in Butler County
- St. Charles, South Carolina, census-designated place in Lee County
- St. Charles, South Dakota, census-designated place in Gregory County
- St. Charles, Virginia, census-designated place in Lee County

== Education ==
- Saint Charles Preparatory School, Catholic high school in Columbus, Ohio, United States
- St. Charles Parish Public School System, public school district headquartered in Luling, Louisiana
- St. Charles Borromeo School, private catholic school in Destrehan, Louisiana
- St. Charles Borromeo High School, former private high school in Destrehan, Louisiana
- St. Charles Catholic High School (Laplace, Louisiana), private high school in the Archdiocese of New Orleans
- St. Charles Community Schools, school district in St. Charles, Michigan
- St. Charles Community Schools, school district in St. Charles, Minnesota
- St. Charles East High School, public high school in St. Charles, Illinois
- St. Charles Garnier College, private secondary school in Quebec City, Quebec
- St Charles' Primary School, primary school in Newton, Scotland
- Saint-Charles International School, private boarding school in Porrentruy, Ajoie in the Swiss Canton of Jura

== Transportation ==
- St. Charles (ship), screw-driven steamboat on the upper Peace River, Canada, 1903–1916
- St. Charles Streetcar Line, Louisiana, U.S.

== Other uses ==
- St. Charles Avenue, Louisiana, U.S.
  - Place St. Charles, skyscraper
- St. Charles Parkway, Maryland, U.S.

== See also ==
- St. Charles' Church (disambiguation)
- St. Charles College (disambiguation)
- St. Charles High School (disambiguation)
- St. Charles Township (disambiguation)
- Charles Borromeo Church (disambiguation)
- Saint Charles Borromeo Seminary (disambiguation)
- San Carlo (disambiguation)
- San Carlos (disambiguation)
- Karlskirche (disambiguation)
