= Saint Charles Borromeo Church =

Charles Borromeo is the patron saint of a number of Catholic churches:

== United States ==
- Mission San Carlos Borromeo de Carmelo, in Carmel-by-the-Sea, California
- St. Charles Borromeo Church (North Hollywood), in Los Angeles, California
- St. Charles Borromeo (Visalia), in Visalia, California
- St. Charles Borromeo Church (Bridgeport, Connecticut), in the Roman Catholic Diocese of Bridgeport
- St. Charles Borromeo Catholic Church or St. Charles of the Valley Catholic Church and Rectory, in Hailey, Idaho
- St. Charles Borromeo Church (Destrehan, Louisiana), in the Archdiocese of New Orleans
- St. Charles Borromeo Church (Waltham, Massachusetts), in Middlesex County
- St. Charles Borromeo Catholic Church (Detroit), in Michigan
- St. Charles Borromeo Catholic Church (Albuquerque, New Mexico) in the Roman Catholic Archdiocese of Santa Fe
- St. Charles Borromeo's Church (Dover Plains, New York), in Dutchess County
- St. Charles Borromeo Church (Greece, New York), in Monroe County
- St. Charles Borromeo's Church (New York City), in Manhattan
- St. Charles Borromeo Catholic Church, Oakes, North Dakota
- St. Charles Borromeo Catholic Church, Drexel Hill, Pennsylvania
- St. Charles Borromeo Church Complex (Woonsocket, Rhode Island), in Providence County
- St. Charles Borromeo Catholic Church, (Fort Wayne, Indiana), in the Roman Catholic Diocese of Fort Wayne–South Bend, Indiana
- St. Charles Borromeo Catholic Church, (Lima, Ohio), in Lima, Ohio.

== Other places ==
- St. Charles Borromeo Church, Antwerp, Belgium
- St. Charles Borromeo Cathedral, Joliette, in Quebec, Canada
- St Charles Borromeo, Hull, East Riding of Yorkshire, England
- St Charles Borromeo Church, Westminster, in the Diocese of Westminster, London, England
- St. Charles Borromeo Cemetery Church, Vienna

== See also ==
- St. Charles' Church (disambiguation)
- Karlskirche (disambiguation)
- San Carlos Cathedral (disambiguation)
- San Carlo Borromeo (disambiguation)
- San Carlo (disambiguation), includes a number of churches dedicated to Charles Borromeo
- Saint Charles Borromeo Seminary (disambiguation)
