= Churchill (surname) =

Churchill is an English surname. The Churchill family lived in Somerset in the town of Curcelle. The name Curcelle, of Norman origin, in England became confused with the name Churchill, which derives from the Old English cyrice, which means "church", and hyll, which means "hill". Notable people with the surname include:

== Family of the Dukes of Marlborough ==
- Winston Churchill (1620–1688), English soldier and politician, father of the first Duke of Marlborough
- John Churchill, 1st Duke of Marlborough (1650–1722), English general during the War of the Spanish Succession
- Sarah Churchill, Duchess of Marlborough (1660–1744), Mistress of the Robes
- Lord Charles Spencer-Churchill (1794–1840), soldier and Member of Parliament
- Lord Randolph Churchill, son of John Winston Spencer-Churchill, 7th Duke of Marlborough, father of Winston Churchill
- Jennie Jerome (Lady Randolph Churchill), mother of Winston Churchill
- Winston Churchill (1874–1965), Prime Minister of the United Kingdom
- Clementine Churchill, Baroness Spencer-Churchill (1885–1977), widow of Sir Winston Churchill
- Jack Churchill (1880–1947), soldier and brother of Winston Churchill
- Diana Churchill, daughter of Winston Churchill
- Randolph Churchill, British Conservative politician and son of Winston Churchill
- Pamela Churchill, former wife of Randolph Churchill (née Pamela Digby, later Pamela Harriman)
- Sarah Churchill (actress), actress and daughter of Winston Churchill
- Marigold Churchill, daughter of Winston Churchill (died young)
- Mary Soames, Baroness Soames, daughter of Winston Churchill
- Winston Churchill (1940–2010), British Conservative politician and grandson of Winston Churchill
- Arabella Churchill (charity founder) daughter of Randolph and granddaughter of Winston Churchill

== Other people ==
- Awnsham Churchill (1658–1728), English bookseller and politician
- Caryl Churchill (born 1938), British playwright
- Charles Churchill (satirist) (1732–1764), poet, author of the Rosciad
- Charles Churchill (disambiguation), multiple people
- Clive Churchill (1927–1985), Australian rugby league player
- Deborah Churchill (1677–1708), British pickpocket and prostitute
- Delores Churchill (born 1929) Canadian Haida traditional weaver
- Diana Josephine Churchill (1913–1994), British actress
- Donald Churchill (1930–1991), English actor and writer
- Frank Churchill (1901–1942), American composer of popular music for films
- Graeme Churchill (born 1987), Scottish footballer
- Herman Churchill (1869–1941), educator, genealogist and historian
- Jack Churchill (1906–1996), eccentric British veteran of World War II and 1948 Palestine war
- James Paul Churchill (1924–2020), American judge
- Jill Churchill (born 1943), American author
- Jim Churchill (1863–1930), American businessman and police captain
- Jo Churchill (born 1964), English Conservative Party politician, Member of Parliament (MP) for Bury St Edmunds since 2015
- John C. Churchill (1821–1905), American politician
- John Spriggs Morss Churchill (1801–1875), English medical publisher
- Joshua Churchill (died 1721), British politician
- Kim Churchill (born 1990), Australian folk, rock, and blues singer-songwriter and musician
- Matthew Churchill (born 1966), British theatre producer
- Odette Churchill (1912–1995), British spy during World War II
- Owen Churchill (1896–1985), Olympic sailor and swim fin inventor
- Oliver Churchill (1914-1997) British Special Operations Executive (SOE) officer during World War II
- Peter Churchill (1909–1972), British spy during World War II
- Robert W. Churchill (born 1947), American lawyer and politician
- Stephen Churchill (c. 1976–1995), British teenager, first human death from variant Creutzfeldt–Jakob disease
- Sylvester Churchill (1783–1862), Inspector General of the US Army
- Thomas James Churchill (1824–1905) American politician, governor of Arkansas
- Tom Churchill (athlete) (1908–1963), American Olympian and standout college sports athlete
- Walter Churchill (1907-1942) British Royal Air Force pilot and flying ace during World War II.
- Ward Churchill (1947–2026), controversial American writer on ethnic studies
- Winston Churchill (novelist) (1871–1947), best-selling American author
