= San Carlos Bay (disambiguation) =

San Carlos Bay is a bay in Florida, U.S.

San Carlos Bay may also refer to:

- San Carlos Water, a bay or fjord in the Falkland Islands
- San Carlos bay, San Carlos Nuevo Guaymas, Sonora, Mexico

== See also ==
- San Carlos (disambiguation)
- USS San Carlos (AVP-51), a U.S. Navy ship named for the bay
