= Gambero Rosso (restaurant) =

Restaurant in Tuscany, Italy

Gambero Rosso (Italian for 'Red Prawn') was a restaurant in San Vincenzo, Tuscany, Italy. Its chef was Fulvio Pierangelini.

The restaurant was voted 12th best in the world in the 2008 Restaurant Top 50, and was awarded 2 stars by the Michelin Guide.

It was closed in November 2008.
