= San Carlos City =

San Carlos City can refer to two places in the Philippines

- San Carlos, Negros Occidental
- San Carlos, Pangasinan

== See also ==
- San Carlos (disambiguation) - for many more places called San Carlos
