= San Carlos =

San Carlos may refer to:

== Places ==
=== Argentina ===
- San Carlos Centro
- San Carlos Department, Mendoza
  - San Carlos, Mendoza
- San Carlos Department, Salta
  - San Carlos, Salta
- San Carlos de Bariloche
- San Carlos de Bolívar
- San Carlos, La Plata, Buenos Aires
- San Carlos Minas
- San Carlos Norte
- San Carlos Sud

=== Belize ===
- San Carlos, Belize

=== Bolivia ===
- San Carlos, Ichilo

=== Brazil ===
- São Carlos, a city in São Paulo

=== Chile ===
- San Carlos, Chile
- Isla de San Carlos was an old Spanish name for the Easter Island

=== Colombia ===
- San Carlos, Antioquia
- San Carlos de Guaroa

=== Costa Rica ===
- San Carlos (canton)
  - Quesada, San Carlos, commonly called San Carlos

=== Dominican Republic ===
- San Carlos, Distrito Nacional

=== El Salvador ===
- San Carlos, Morazán
- La Unión, El Salvador, formerly known as San Carlos

=== Equatorial Guinea ===
- San Carlos (Equatorial Guinea), a volcano
- Luba, Equatorial Guinea, formerly known as San Carlos

=== Falkland Islands ===
- San Carlos, Falkland Islands
  - Port San Carlos
  - San Carlos River (Falkland Islands)
  - San Carlos Water

=== Guatemala ===
- San Carlos Alzatate
- San Carlos Sija

=== Mexico ===
- San Carlos Nuevo Guaymas, Sonora
- San Carlos Yautepec, Oaxaca
- San Carlos, Baja California Sur, or Puerto San Carlos
- San Carlos Municipality, Tamaulipas

=== Nicaragua ===
- San Carlos, Río San Juan

=== Panama ===
- San Carlos, Chiriquí
- San Carlos, Panamá Oeste

=== Paraguay ===
- San Carlos, Paraguay

=== Peru ===
- San Carlos District, Bongará

=== Philippines ===
- San Carlos, Valencia, barangay in Bukidnon
- San Carlos, Negros Occidental
- San Carlos, Pangasinan

=== United States ===
- San Carlos, Arizona
- San Carlos Apache Indian Reservation, Arizona
  - San Carlos Lake
- Paseo de San Carlos, San Jose, California
- San Carlos, California, San Mateo County
- San Carlos, Inyo County, California, a former settlement
- San Carlos, San Diego, California
- San Carlos Bay, Florida
- San Carlos Park, Florida
- Fort San Carlos, Florida
- San Carlos, Texas

=== Uruguay ===
- San Carlos, Uruguay

=== Venezuela ===
- San Carlos, Cojedes
- San Carlos de Borromeo Fortress, Isla Margarita
- San Carlos de Río Negro

== People and languages ==
- Charles Borromeo or San Carlos Borromeo, 16th century archbishop and cardinal
- Saint Charles of Sezze, an Italian professed religious from the Order of Friars Minor
- Rumsen people, or San Carlos Costanoan, a group of the Ohlone indigenous people of California
  - Rumsen language, or San Carlos Costanoan language

== Ships ==
- San Carlos (1767 ship), alias Toysón de Oro
- San Carlos (1780 ship), later Hinchinbrooke
- USS San Carlos (AVP-51), a U.S. Navy ship

== Transportation ==
- San Carlos station, a Caltrain regional rail station in California, United States
- San Carlos metro station (Lima), a rapid transit station in Lima, Peru
- San Carlos (Mexibús), a bus rapid transit station in Ecatepec, Mexico

== Universities ==
- Colegio Nacional de Buenos Aires, formerly known as Real Colegio de San Carlos, Argentina
- University of San Carlos, Cebu City, Philippines
- Universidad de San Carlos de Guatemala, Guatemala City
- Federal University of São Carlos, São Carlos, Brazil

== Other uses ==
- A.D. San Carlos, a football team from Ciudad Quesada, Costa Rica
- San Carlos Convent, San Lorenzo, Santa Fe, Argentina
- San Carlos Fortress, Perote, Veracruz, Mexico
- San Carlos Stakes, an American Thoroughbred horse race
- Teatro di San Carlo, the opera house in Naples, Italy
- Teatro Nacional de São Carlos, the opera house in Lisbon, Portugal

== See also ==
- San Carlos Airport (disambiguation)
- San Carlos River (disambiguation)
- San Carlos Cathedral (disambiguation)
- Rancho San Carlos (disambiguation)
