= Bibliotheca Bipontina =

German historic library

Coordinates: 49°14′58.3692″N 7°21′59.724″E

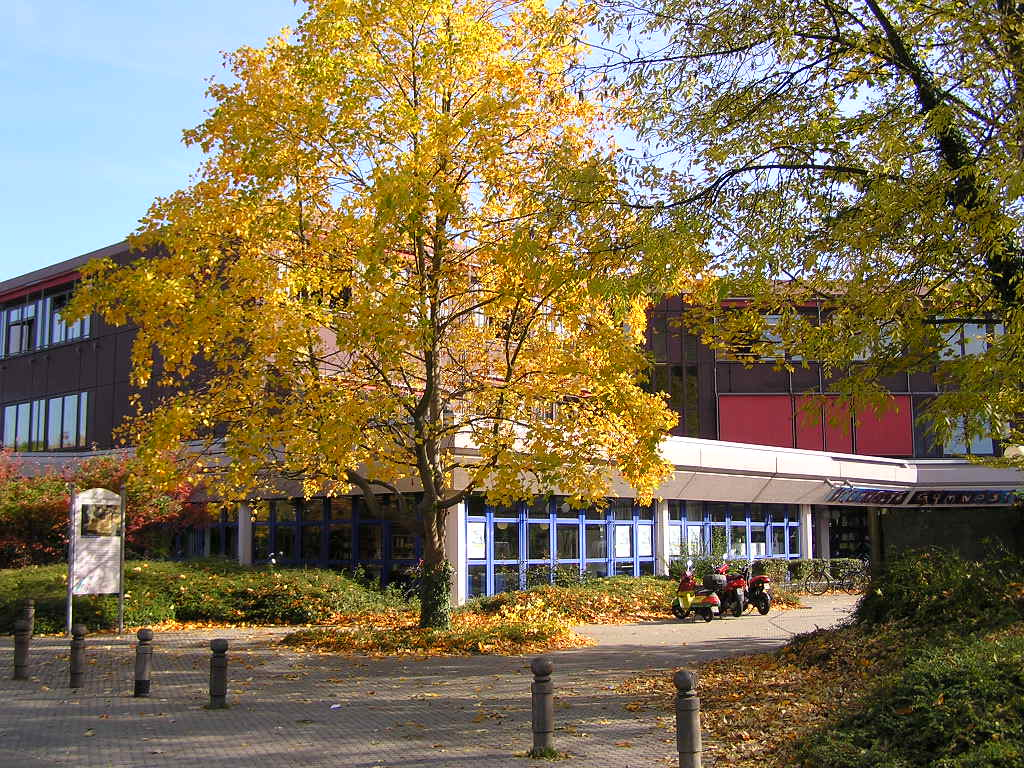
Bibliotheca Bipontina

The Bibliotheca Bipontina is a regional scientific library in Zweibrücken, which has been part of the Landesbibliothekszentrum Rheinland-Pfalz since 1 September 2004. It is one of the most important Altbestand libraries in the land.

The book stock amounts to about 120,600 volumes as of 2012, including 12,000 volumes of the museum's old stock from the princely libraries of the dukes of Zweibrück. It also holds the libraries of the Association for Palatine Church History (about 20,000 volumes) and the Zweibrücken Historical Association (about 10,000 volumes). The main focus of the holdings is on regional literature of the Palatinate and on humanities subjects. The founding collection of the Bibliotheca Bipontina was included in the Länderverzeichnis national wertvollen Kulturgutes in 2015.

== History ==
While the libraries in Zweibrücken were almost completely destroyed by the war events of the 17th century, the library in Bischwiller of the Birkenfeld line remained, which was brought to the Zweibrücken residence in the 18th century. It was held by Charles I, Count Palatine of Zweibrücken-Birkenfeld (died 1600), Duke Wolfgang, Count Palatine of Zweibrücken's youngest son, and was continually expanded by his heirs. In his will, Count Palatine Karl made it his duty to his heirs to maintain and expand the library and stipulated that "the library be left with the County of Sponheim".

In the 18th century, intellectual life flourished in Zweibrücken, book printing (the famous editions of the Bipont Editions were published here) and of course also the library. The head of the library at that time was the grammar school rector Georg Christian Crollius, a renowned scholar.

Since the end of the 19th century, the Bipontina had been part of the humanistic Herzog-Wolfgang-Gymnasium. After its dissolution, it became an independent state institution in 1988, then integrated into a newly founded Rhineland-Palatinate State Library Centre in 2004.
