= Charles Church =

Charles Church may refer to:

== People ==
- Charles Edward Church (1835–1906), Canadian politician
- Charles Lot Church (1777–1864), Nova Scotian politician
- Charles Church (artist) (born 1970), British painter
- Charles Church (businessman) (c. 1944–1989), British businessman and Spitfire enthusiast who co-founded Charles Church Developments
- Charlie Church (1929–2010), Scottish footballer

== Places ==
- Charles Church, Plymouth, a ruined church and war memorial, Devon, England
- Charles's Church, Tallinn, a Lutheran church in Tallinn, Estonia
- St. Charles' Church (disambiguation), churches dedicated to St. Charles

== Business ==
- Charles Church Developments, British upmarket housebuilding company which is now a subsidiary of Persimmon plc

== See also ==
- Charles Churchill (disambiguation)
