= Elmer Heindl =

Elmer W. Heindl
- Born: June 14, 1910; Rochester, New York, United States
- Died: July 17, 2006 (aged 96); Rochester, New York, United States
- Military career
- Allegiance: (United States)
- Branch: United States Army
- Service years: 1941–1974
- Unit: 98th Reserve Training Division
- Conflicts: World War II; *Guadalcanal; *New Britain; *Bougainville, Manila; *Philippines
- Awards: Distinguished Service Cross; Bronze Star; Silver Star; Legion of Merit
- Other work: Priest in a number of parishes, Catholic missions to Genoa, New York and Fleming, New York

Elmer W. Heindl (June 14, 1910 – July 17, 2006) was an American U.S. Army chaplain during the Second World War. Enlisting in 1942, Heindl served in the Pacific theater, including Guadalcanal, New Britain, Bougainville, Manila and the Philippines. He became one of the most highly decorated chaplains of the war.

== Biography ==
Heindl was born in Rochester, New York on June 14, 1910 to Florence May and William Casper Heindl. He was the oldest of 6 children and graduated from St. Andrew's Preparatory Seminary and St. Bernard's Seminary to become a Catholic priest on June 6, 1936. Enlisting in March 1942 as a US Army chaplain, Heindl served in the Pacific. He was decorated in 1943 for aiding US troops while under mortar fire, and in 1944 received the Bronze Star for helping bury American dead in the Solomon Islands, and was awarded the Silver Star a year later in the Philippines. Also in 1945 he was awarded the Distinguished Service Cross for "heroism under fire" in Manila on April 15, one of only 19 chaplains to have been awarded it. Heindl retrieved the body of an American casualty from a prison watchtower while under fire and then returned to rescue a wounded soldier with the aid of Private First Class Elmer Russell, who also received the Distinguished Service Cross. The two men gave aid to the dying soldier while continually under fire every time Russell used a flashlight to assess the injuries. Two days later, on April 17, Heindl rescued American colonel Lawrence Kermit White, bringing him to an aid station while under fire. Of these actions he stated:

I went down there to do my duty as [a] chaplain, and that's what saved me, [the distinguished service cross] doesn't add one bit to my stature. Whatever happened was none of my doing whatsoever.

After the war, Heindl served in the parishes of St. Charles Borromeo in Greece, St. Andrew and St. Mary in Rochester, Holy Trinity in Webster and St. Theodore in Gates, as well as on missions to Genoa, New York and Fleming, New York. In 1970 he was awarded the Legion of Merit, and he continued to serve until he retired in 1980. Heindl went on to serve with the Monroe County Veterans of Foreign Wars, the United Veterans Association of Monroe County and the Monroe County Veterans' Advisory Committee, the latter awarded him the Veterans Advocate of the Year award in 1991.

In March 2006, Heindl received 3rd degree burns after falling in a shower, and was recuperating in Rochester's Strong Memorial Hospital's burn unit when he died on July 17.

On September 8, 2012, the Armed Forces Reserve Center at Fort Benning, Georgia was memorialized in honor of Chaplain Heindl.
