= San Carlos Cathedral =

San Carlos Cathedral may refer to:

- Cathedral Basilica of San Carlos Borromeo (Puno), Peru
- Cathedral of San Carlos Borromeo (Matanzas), Cuba
- Cathedral of San Carlos Borromeo (Monterey, California), United States
- Cathedral of San Carlos Borromeo (Negros Occidental), Philippines
- Cathedral of San Carlos (Cojedes), Venezuela
- Cathedral of San Carlos de Bariloche, Argentina

== See also ==
- Charles Borromeo or San Carlos Borromeo
- Charles Borromeo Church (disambiguation)
- San Carlos (disambiguation)
- Saint Charles (disambiguation)
- St. Charles Borromeo Cathedral, São Carlos, Brazil
