= St. Charles High School =

St. Charles High School may refer to one of several schools in the United States:

- St. Charles East High School, public school in St. Charles, Illinois
- St. Charles North High School, public school in St. Charles, Illinois
- St. Charles High School (Maryland), public school in Waldorf, Maryland
- St. Charles High School (Minnesota), public school in St. Charles, Minnesota
- St. Charles High School (Missouri), public school in St. Charles, Missouri
- St. Charles West High School, public school in St. Charles, Missouri
- Saint Charles Preparatory School, Catholic private school in Columbus, Ohio

== See also ==
- Saint Charles (disambiguation)
