= San Carlo Borromeo (disambiguation) =

San Carlo Borromeo is an Italian saint. San Carlo Borromeo may also refer to:

- San Carlo Borromeo-class ship of the line, class of two 66-gun third rates built by the Venetian Arsenal
- San Carlo Borromeo, Ferrara, church located in Ferrara, Emilia-Romagna, Italy
- San Carlo Borromeo, San Martino in Rio church located in San Martino in Rio, Emilia-Romagna, Italy
- San Carlo Borromeo, Turin, church located in Turin, Piedmont, Italy
- Venetian ship San Carlo Borromeo, first-rank ship of the line of the Venetian navy

== See also ==
- Carlo Borromeo (disambiguation)
- Saint Charles Borromeo Church (disambiguation)
