= R2-D2 =

Robot character from Star Wars

- Star Wars character
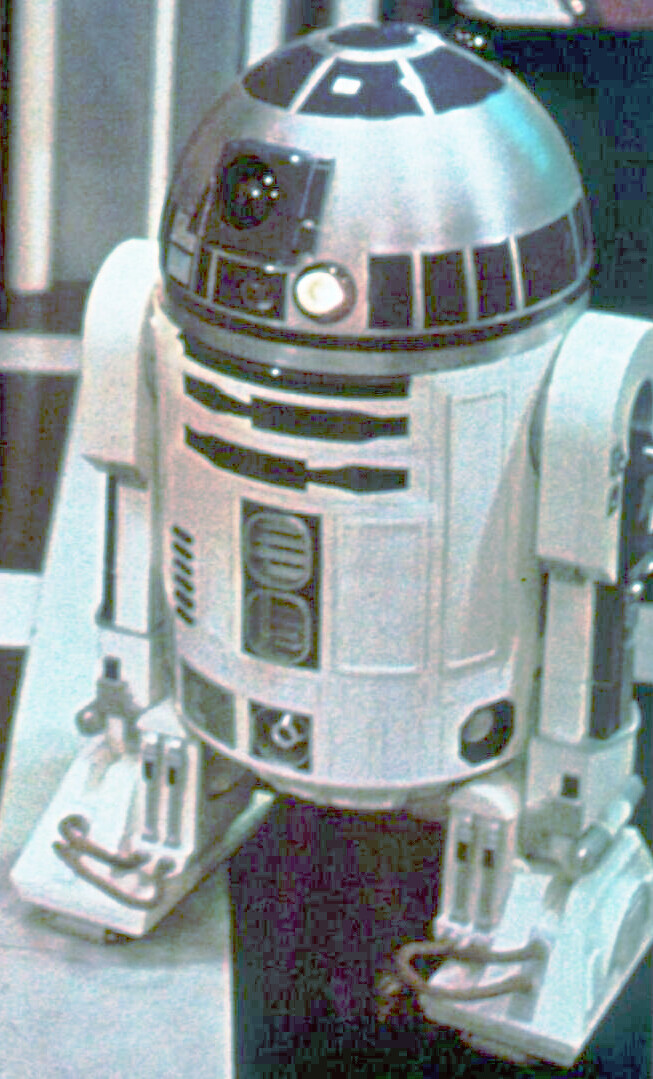
- First appearance: Star Wars: From the Adventures of Luke Skywalker (1976 novel)
- Created by: George Lucas
- Portrayed by: Kenny Baker (Note: Episodes I–VII); Deep Roy (Note: Episodes V–VI); Jimmy Vee (Note: The Force Awakens, The Last Jedi); Hassan Taj (Note: The Rise of Skywalker); Lee Towersey; Christine Galey (Note: The Book of Boba Fett)

In-universe information
- Class: Astromech droid
- Affiliation: Kingdom of Naboo; Galactic Republic; Galactic Empire (briefly); Rebel Alliance; New Republic; Resistance
- Homeworld: Naboo

R2-D2 (/ˌɑːr.tuːˈdiːtuː/) or Artoo-Detoo is a fictional robot character in the Star Wars franchise created by George Lucas. He has appeared in ten of the twelve theatrical Star Wars films to date, including every film in the "Skywalker Saga." At various points throughout the course of the films, R2, an astromech droid, is a friend to C-3PO, Padmé Amidala, Anakin Skywalker, Leia Organa, Luke Skywalker, and Obi-Wan Kenobi. R2-D2 and his companion C-3PO are the only characters to appear in every theatrical Star Wars film, with the exception of Solo: A Star Wars Story (2018) and The Mandalorian and Grogu (2026).

English actor Kenny Baker played R2-D2 in all three original Star Wars films and received billing credit for the character in the prequel trilogy, where Baker's role as R2-D2 was reduced and the character was portrayed mainly by radio controlled props and CGI models. In the sequel trilogy, Baker was credited as consultant for The Force Awakens, with Jimmy Vee co-performing the character in some scenes. Vee later took over the role, starting with The Last Jedi. In The Rise of Skywalker, puppeteers Hassan Taj and Lee Towersey perform the role of R2-D2. His sounds and vocal effects were created by sound designer Ben Burtt.

R2-D2 was designed in artwork by Ralph McQuarrie, co-developed by John Stears and built by Peteric Engineering. The revised Empire Strikes Back droids had fibreglass shells built by Tony Dyson and his White Horse Toy Company.

== Design ==
George Lucas's creation of R2-D2 was influenced by the peasant Matashichi from Akira Kurosawa's 1958 film The Hidden Fortress. Lucas and artist Ralph McQuarrie also drew inspiration from the robots Huey, Dewey, and Louie from Douglas Trumbull's 1972 film Silent Running.

Sound editor Walter Murch claims to be responsible for the utterance which sparked the name for the droid. Murch asked for Reel 2, Dialog Track 2, in the abbreviated form "R-2-D-2". Lucas, who was in the room and had dozed off while working on the script for Star Wars, momentarily woke when he heard the request and, after asking for clarification, stated that it was a "great name" before going back to writing his script.

Tony Dyson, owner of the special effects studio The White Horse Toy Company, was commissioned by special effects supervisor Brian Johnson to fabricate the revised mechanical design for The Empire Strikes Back, making several units operated by remote control. A number were used by Baker, and two were stunt double models.

== Appearances ==
=== Original trilogy ===
==== Star Wars ====
R2-D2 and C-3PO (Anthony Daniels) are both introduced on board the Tantive IV, along with Princess Leia (Carrie Fisher) of Alderaan. They are being pursued by Darth Vader (portrayed by David Prowse, voiced by James Earl Jones) aboard an Imperial Star Destroyer. Leia gives R2-D2 an information disc containing the plans for the Death Star battle station, and encodes a distress message on the droid's holographic projector. The droids then escape in a pod that crashes on Tatooine near Jedi Master Obi-Wan Kenobi's (Alec Guinness) desert abode.

R2-D2 and C-3PO are then abducted by Jawas and bought by Owen (Phil Brown) and Beru Lars (Shelagh Fraser), uncle and aunt of Luke Skywalker (Mark Hamill). While Luke cleans the sand out of R2-D2's gears, he discovers a fragment of Leia's message, and removes the droid's restraining bolt to see more; once free of the bolt, R2 claims to have no knowledge of the message. That night, R2-D2 leaves the farm to seek out Obi-Wan. When Owen and Beru are killed by Imperial stormtroopers, Luke is forced to leave Tatooine with Obi-Wan, Han Solo (Harrison Ford), and Chewbacca (Peter Mayhew) on board the Millennium Falcon to deliver R2-D2 to the Rebel Alliance. On their arrival at Alderaan's co-ordinates, they are pulled in by the Death Star's tractor beam and are forced to land, but eventually rescue Princess Leia. After Vader kills Obi-Wan, the rest of the group escapes and delivers the Death Star plans to the Rebel Alliance. R2 later serves as Luke's droid during the attack on the station. R2-D2 is severely damaged during the battle, but is repaired before the ceremony at the end of the film.

==== The Empire Strikes Back ====
In The Empire Strikes Back, R2-D2 accompanies Luke to Dagobah, and later to Cloud City, where he helps to rescue and repair a heavily damaged C-3PO and to override city security computers. He also manages to reactivate the Millennium Falcon's hyperdrive, resulting in a last-minute escape from Imperial forces.

==== Return of the Jedi ====
In Return of the Jedi, R2-D2 plays a critical role in rescuing Luke, Leia, and Han from Jabba the Hutt. He later joins the Rebel strike team on Endor. He is badly damaged during the battle between the Imperial troops and the Rebels, but is repaired in time for the celebration marking the second Death Star's destruction and the fall of the Empire.

=== Prequel trilogy ===
==== The Phantom Menace ====
In The Phantom Menace, set 32 years before A New Hope, R2-D2 is portrayed as belonging to the Naboo defense forces, one of five astromech droids deployed for repair duty onboard Queen Padmé Amidala's (Natalie Portman) starship as it attempts to get past the Trade Federation blockade. The sole survivor of the five, R2-D2 repairs the deflector shields and saves the day. Having proved his worth, R2-D2 then becomes part of Jedi Master Qui-Gon Jinn's (Liam Neeson) party on Tatooine where he meets nine-year-old Anakin Skywalker (Jake Lloyd) and C-3PO, whom Anakin built from scrap. Later still, he serves as the astromech droid for Anakin's starfighter during the Battle of Naboo, helping Anakin destroy the Trade Federation's command center and free the planet Naboo from the Federation's grip. R2-D2, along with Anakin and the young Obi-Wan Kenobi (Ewan McGregor), are awarded medals by Padmé and Boss Nass (Brian Blessed) at the end of the film.

==== Attack of the Clones ====
In Attack of the Clones, set 10 years after The Phantom Menace, R2-D2 again serves Obi-Wan and Anakin (Hayden Christensen), who is now Obi-Wan's Jedi apprentice. He accompanies Anakin and Padmé to Naboo, and then to Tatooine when Anakin tries in vain to rescue his mother Shmi (Pernilla August) from a pack of Tusken Raiders. Here, he is reunited with C-3PO, and the two get into various misadventures on the planet Geonosis. He and C-3PO are later witness to Anakin and Padmé's secret wedding.

==== Revenge of the Sith ====
In Revenge of the Sith, set three years later, R2-D2 helps Anakin and Obi-Wan in their mission to rescue Chancellor Palpatine (Ian McDiarmid) from Count Dooku's (Christopher Lee) capital ship, the Invisible Hand. He is attacked by super battle droids, but he defeats them through ingenious tactics. After Anakin falls to the dark side of the Force and becomes Darth Vader, he takes R2-D2 with him when he goes to assassinate the Separatist council, but he tells him to stay with the ship. After Obi-Wan defeats Vader in a lightsaber duel, R2-D2 goes with him aboard Padmé's ship, where he witnesses Padmé’s death after giving birth to her and Vader's children, Luke and Leia.

After Palpatine and Vader overthrow the Republic and establish the Galactic Empire at the end of the film, C-3PO's memory is erased to keep the knowledge of Luke and Leia's locations a secret from their father. However, R2-D2's memory is not wiped; as a result, R2-D2 is the only surviving character at the end of the saga who knows the entire story of the Skywalker family. Both R2-D2 and C-3PO end up in the possession of Captain Raymus Antilles (Rohan Nichol) onboard the Tantive IV.

=== Sequel trilogy ===
==== The Force Awakens ====
In Star Wars: The Force Awakens, set approximately 30 years after Return of the Jedi, R2-D2 is revealed to be kept in storage at the Resistance base on the planet D'Qar, having put himself in a low-power mode after Luke Skywalker's disappearance. He later awakens and reveals Luke's location by combining map data stored in his memory with that of the droid BB-8. He then travels with Rey (Daisy Ridley) and Chewbacca to the planet highlighted on the map, where they find Luke in self-imposed exile. In the credits, Kenny Baker was credited as 'R2-D2 consultant,' while Jimmy Vee provided an uncredited portrayal in some scenes.

==== The Last Jedi ====
R2-D2 appeared in Star Wars: The Last Jedi, with actor Jimmy Vee taking over the role from Kenny Baker, who retired from the role due to his age and health. Baker died in August 2016.

R2-D2 has a brief but pivotal role in the film, reuniting with Luke aboard the Millennium Falcon and showing him Leia's distress message from the original film in a successful attempt to convince Luke to train Rey. He is later shown interfacing with the Falcon's computer while Rey and Chewbacca pilot the ship amid the final confrontation with the evil First Order's forces.

==== The Rise of Skywalker ====
R2-D2 returns once more in Star Wars: The Rise of Skywalker. Initially remaining at the Resistance base, he is shown watching Leia as she dies. He later plays an important role in restoring C-3PO's memory after Rey, Finn (John Boyega) and Poe Dameron (Oscar Isaac) are forced to erase it so the droid can translate a Sith artifact that holds a clue to the location of the Sith homeworld, the resurrected Palpatine, and the Sith Eternal's fleet, the Final Order. R2-D2 accompanies Poe in his X-wing for the final assault and is later shown joining the others in celebrating the defeat of Palpatine and the Sith Eternal.

=== Anthology films ===
==== Rogue One ====
R2-D2 makes a cameo appearance in Rogue One alongside C-3PO.

=== Television ===
R2-D2 and C-3PO had their own animated series, Star Wars: Droids, set before they came into Luke Skywalker's possession. This was excluded from the new canon in 2014. They also appear in both the live action and animated segments of the Star Wars Holiday Special. In the animated segment they are rescued by a mysterious bounty hunter, Boba Fett, who offers to help them. Later R2-D2 intercepts a transmission between Darth Vader and Fett – thus confirming to him, C-3PO and the others Fett's true allegiances.

R2-D2 makes a guest appearance with C-3PO, Luke Skywalker (and Mark Hamill) and Chewbacca in an episode of The Muppet Show.

R2-D2 appears in the 2008 animated film Star Wars: The Clone Wars, and the subsequent TV series of the same name. In the film, he accompanies Anakin (voiced by Matt Lanter) and his Padawan Ahsoka Tano (voiced by Ashley Eckstein) on a mission to rescue Jabba the Hutt's son Rotta. In the series, he helps them fight the Separatists. He previously appeared in Star Wars: Clone Wars, but this micro-series has been excluded from the new canon.

R2-D2 also appears in Star Wars Rebels in the episodes "Droids in Distress" and "Blood Sisters", and in several episodes of Star Wars Forces of Destiny.

In the second season finale of the Disney+ series The Mandalorian, R2-D2 accompanies Luke Skywalker as he goes to retrieve Grogu to be trained as a Jedi.

R2-D2 appears in the sixth and seventh episodes of The Mandalorian spin-off series The Book of Boba Fett. After Grogu decides to abandon his Jedi training, Luke has R2-D2 fly Grogu to Tatooine in his X-wing starfighter so that he may be reunited with his guardian, Din Djarin (Pedro Pascal).

R2-D2 also appears in the 2025 animated web series, Droid Diaries.

=== Novels and comics ===
The novelization of Attack of the Clones makes it clear that R2-D2 has been in Padmé's possession since the events of The Phantom Menace. R2-D2 appears in Marvel's 2015 Star Wars comic series, which is set between the films of the original trilogy. He also appears briefly in the miniseries Star Wars: Shattered Empire.

==== Legends ====
With the 2012 acquisition of Lucasfilm by The Walt Disney Company, most of the licensed Star Wars novels and comics produced since the originating 1977 film Star Wars were rebranded as Star Wars Legends and declared non-canon to the franchise in April 2014.

- In the various Star Wars novels and comics, the droid duo have played a small but significant role. In the Expanded Universe novel The Swarm War, R2-D2 inadvertently helps Luke and Leia come to grips with their heritage when an electronic glitch unearths long-concealed images of Anakin relating his fear of losing Padmé, and of Padmé's death.
- In issue No. 12 of Star Wars: Legacy, R2-D2 is revealed to have survived the resulting 88 years after his last appearance and has been upgraded to the latest technology. In this series, he now serves another member of the Skywalker family – reluctant Jedi Cade Skywalker.

=== Other films ===
Along with the Star Wars films, R2-D2 makes non-canon cameo appearances in several other films, including: Star Trek and Star Trek Into Darkness, where he was seen flying in debris; Close Encounters of the Third Kind, in which he is seen on the underside of the alien ship; in Raiders of the Lost Ark, in which he is seen on the wall of the room containing the Ark; in Poltergeist, where he is seen in several objects in Robbie's room; and in Transformers: Revenge of the Fallen, where he is seen flying among rubble and debris in the sky. In Ready Player One, R2-D2 is also seen as a toy model in Wade and Samantha's apartment. He also appears in the Wreck-It Ralph sequel, Ralph Breaks the Internet.

In an early script to 2014's The Lego Movie, R2-D2 was set to be one of the main characters, but was written out due to the directors failing to obtain the rights to the character.

== Production ==
Several R2-D2 models were built for the original Star Wars films; one that was remote controlled and rolled on three wheeled legs, and others which were worn by English actor Kenny Baker and walked on two legs. Set director Roger Christian cited the Daleks of Doctor Who as an inspiration for how the crew realized an actor could control R2-D2's prop from the inside. Deep Roy served as Baker's double, in both Episodes V and VI; providing stunts and filling in when Baker was unavailable. The original props for Star Wars Episode IV: A New Hope were designed by John Stears and built by Stears' team and Peteric Engineering. The revised fibreglass droids used in The Empire Strikes Back were built by Tony Dyson and the White Horse Toy Company. The radio controlled R2 was operated by John Stears in A New Hope, Brian Johnson in The Empire Strikes Back and by Kit West in Return of the Jedi.

Kenny Baker, who portrayed R2-D2 in costume, was not involved in the Star Wars Holiday Special. R2-D2 was portrayed entirely by a radio controlled unit, operated by Mick Garris (Lucas's receptionist at the time). In the credits, R2-D2 is credited as playing himself. Garris later went on to operate the radio controlled R2-D2 at various events, including the Oscars.

There were a total of 15 R2-D2s on the set of Attack of the Clones. Eight were radio-controlled; two were worn by Baker; the remainder were stunt models that could be moved by puppet strings or towed by wires. The robotic R2-D2s were prone to failure, particularly while shooting the Tatooine scenes in Tunisia.

Radio-controlled units were extensively utilized for the Prequel trilogy due to advances in technology, though Baker was still used in some scenes. R2-D2 had three principal operators: Don Bies, Jolyon Bambridge and Grant Imahara.

The sound effects for R2-D2's "voice" were created by sound designer Ben Burtt, using an ARP 2600 analog synthesizer, as well as his own vocalizations processed through other effects. Original props of R2-D2 and C-3PO are used as Audio-Animatronics in the queue area of Disneyland's Star Tours–The Adventures Continue attraction.

Although Kenny Baker is credited, Anthony Daniels (who portrays C-3PO) has stated that Baker did not film any scenes in Revenge of the Sith. Baker himself has said he probably only appears in footage caught while shooting the previous two movies.

For The Force Awakens, producer Kathleen Kennedy hired two fans, Lee Towersey and Oliver Steeples, to build new R2-D2 robots for the film, after being impressed by their working replicas that were brought to Star Wars Celebration Europe in 2013. Towersey was also one of the two puppeteers, along with Hassan Taj, who operated the droid in The Rise of Skywalker.

Ewan McGregor, who portrayed Obi-Wan Kenobi in the Star Wars prequel trilogy, said in an interview, "As soon as R2-D2 comes on the set, everyone goes a bit silly." He said "there is something about him that makes you feel great affection for him". In the DVD audio commentary for Revenge of the Sith, George Lucas says R2-D2 is his favorite character, and that it is intentional that R2-D2 saves the day at least once in every film.

== Cultural influence ==
R2-D2 and C-3PO guest starred in two episodes of Sesame Street in 1980. The two droids were featured as presenters at the 50th Academy Awards.

Around the same time that A New Hope was being shot, Ray Harryhausen had already created "Bubo" for the 1981 film Clash of the Titans. In the film, Bubo is a mechanical metal owl that flies heavily and communicates through whistles and tweets. Harryhausen denied a relation.

R2-D2 was inducted into the Robot Hall of Fame in 2003 in Pittsburgh, Pennsylvania. A replica can be seen at the Carnegie Science Center in Pittsburgh. The Smithsonian Institution included R2-D2 in its list of 101 Objects that Made America. In 2022 R2-D2 was surveyed as being the most popular movie robot in the United States.

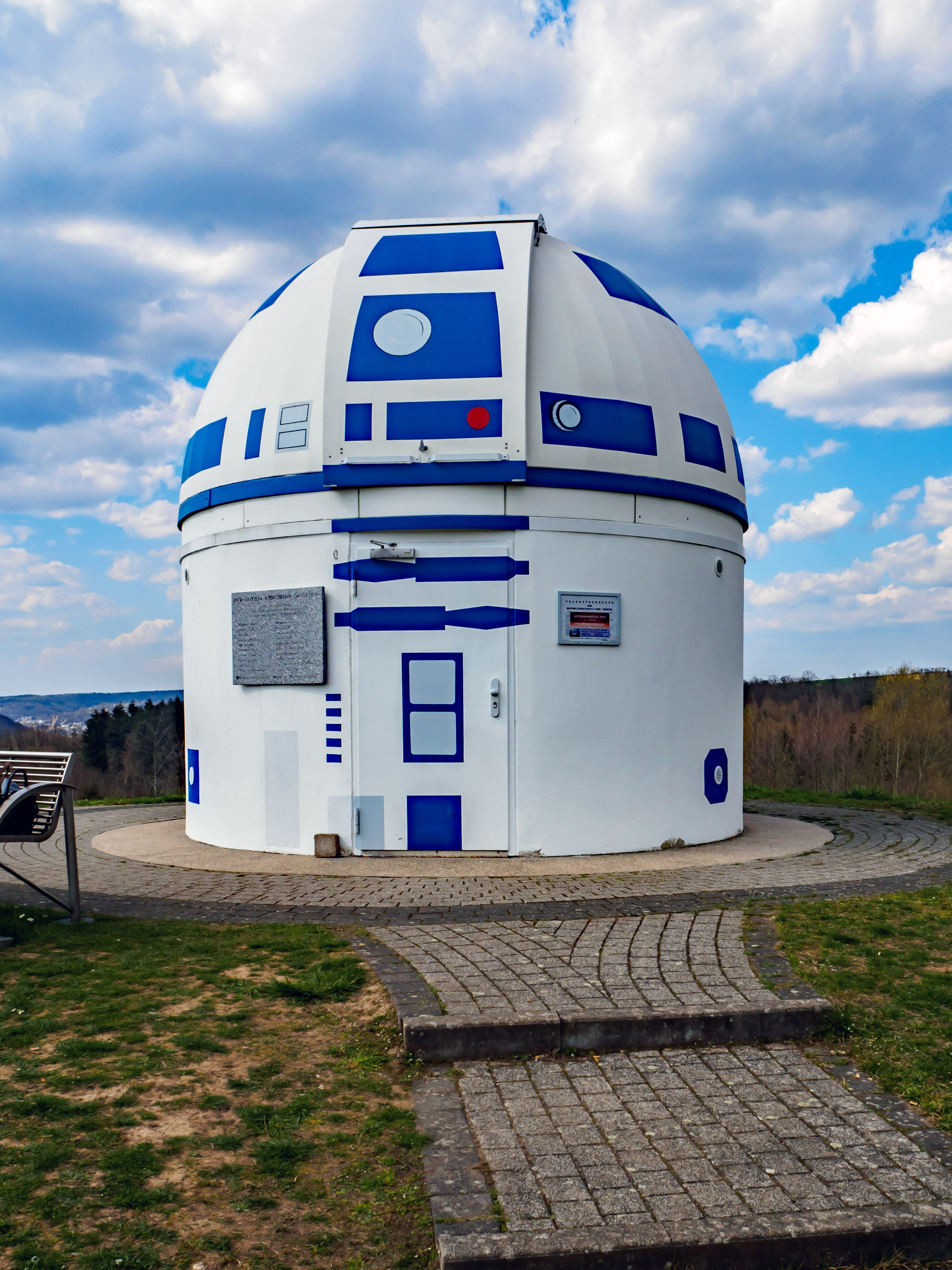
Zweibrücken Observatory in 2019

The telescope dome of Zweibrücken Observatory in Germany was repainted to resemble R2-D2 in 2018.

In the Latin American Spanish dubbing of the Star Wars films, the name R2-D2 is pronounced as "Arturito" (Little Arthur), which sounds similar to the English pronunciation.

In the Italian version of the original trilogy, R2-D2 was named "C1-P8". Anglicisms were not common in the Italian language during the 1970s and 1980s, and the names of various characters were changed to be easier to pronounce and recognize for Italian speakers. Some of these changes were reverted in the dubbing of the prequel and sequel trilogies, where the original name R2-D2 was used instead. Other name changes in the Italian version of the original trilogy include C-3PO, Han Solo, Leia Organa and Darth Vader, who were called respectively "D-3BO", "Ian Solo", "Leila Organa" and "Dart Fener" (or "Lord Fener").
