= Tony Dyson =

British special effects designer (1947–2016)

- Born: Anthony John Dyson; 13 April 1947; Dewsbury, West Yorkshire, England
- Died: 4 March 2016 (aged 68); Gozo, Malta
- Occupation: Special effects designer
- Known for: Rebuilding R2-D2 in the Empire Strikes Back
- Notable work: The Empire Strikes Back; Superman II; James Bond; Saturn 3 Dragon Slayer; Altered States
- Spouses: Anne; Orianna (divorced)

Anthony John Dyson (13 April 1947 – 4 March 2016) was a British special effects (SPFX) designer, best known for working on the R2-D2 droid props used in The Empire Strikes Back and subsequent films in the Star Wars film series.

== Life ==
Born in Dewsbury, West Yorkshire, he attended the private Stratton House School in Abingdon.

He founded rocking-horse manufacturer The White Horse Toy Company in Crawley, a small village near Oxford. The company was commissioned by special visual effects supervisor Brian Johnson to fabricate fibreglass shells for the rebuilt R2-D2 props. These were used in the Star Wars sequel, The Empire Strikes Back, and were based on the designs of Ralph McQuarrie, John Stears and others. His team built around eight bodies. Two were used by Kenny Baker, two were stunt shells used for scenes such as shooting the droid from the swamp onto the shore on Dagobah, and most of the rest were mechanized with radio controllers by an effects team at EMI Studios.

Dyson also created robotics and props for Superman II, Moonraker, and Dragonslayer. He also worked on Saturn 3.

In the mid-1980s, he moved with his family to Kissamos on the island of Crete, where he created a robotics lab as well as a western-themed arcade, in which several of his cowboy robots were used as interactive arcade games.

In the 1990s, he moved to Malta and founded Turn Page Studios in St. Paul's Bay. He died on the island of Gozo.

== Awards ==
Dyson was knighted in the Byzantine Order of the Holy Sepulchre for promoting philanthropic, cultural and ecumenical activities.

In 1985, he was nominated for an Emmy Award for a Sony commercial featuring a John Cleese look-alike robot.

In 2013, Dyson was honoured with the title of Honorary Professor MBA in multimedia for the Stichting Euregio University in the Netherlands.
