= San Carlo =

San Carlo is the Italian for Saint Charles and may refer to:

- San Carlo (company), an Italian manufacturer of snack foods
- San Carlo, Graubünden, a village in the municipality of Poschiavo, canton of Graubünden, Switzerland
- San Carlo, San Vincenzo, a small village in the province of Livorno, Italy
- Teatro di San Carlo, an opera house in Naples, Italy

== See also ==
- Charles Borromeo or San Carlo Borromeo
- Saint Charles (disambiguation)
- San Carlo ai Catinari, an early-Baroque-style church building in Rome
- San Carlo al Corso, a basilica church in Rome
- San Carlo al Corso (Milan), a church in Milan
- San Carlo all'Arena, a neighbourhood in Naples where the Bourbon Hospice for the Poor is located
- San Carlo alle Quattro Fontane, a church in Rome
- San Carlo Canavese, a municipality in the province of Turin in Piedmont, Italy
- San Carlo, Erice, a church in Sicily
