= Carl Bersch =

American painter

Carl Bersch (1834–1914) was a Kingdom of Bavaria-born American painter. He became known as the artist who created the only known sketch of President Abraham Lincoln being carried from the Ford's Theatre.

== Life ==
=== Early life ===
Carl Bersch was born in Zweibrücken, Kingdom of Bavaria on May 3, 1834. His father was the cabinetmaker Jakob Bernhard Bersch and mother was Carolina Friederike née Heintz. Already during his school days at the grammar school in Zweibrücken his drawing talent was recognizable. His desire to study at the Munich Academy of Fine Arts, however, was not fulfilled for the time being, instead he began at the urging of his father, a mining study at the local Polytechnic. In addition to studying, he took evening classes at the Academy of Arts and finally his father consented to the art studies.

In 1854 he entered as a student in the Munich Academy of Fine Arts. After completing his training in 1859, Bersch returned to Zweibrücken to work as a portrait painter. One year later, he emigrated to the United States. After his arrival, he spent a short time in Memphis and Baltimore, where he could already live from portraiture, before moving to Washington, D.C. He worked in Mathew Brady's photography studio.

=== Lincoln Borne by Loving Hands ===
Bersch was sitting on a porch near the Ford's Theatre on the evening that President Abraham Lincoln went to watch his last play. He was sketching a group of Union soldiers and musicians in a victory procession up Tenth Street.

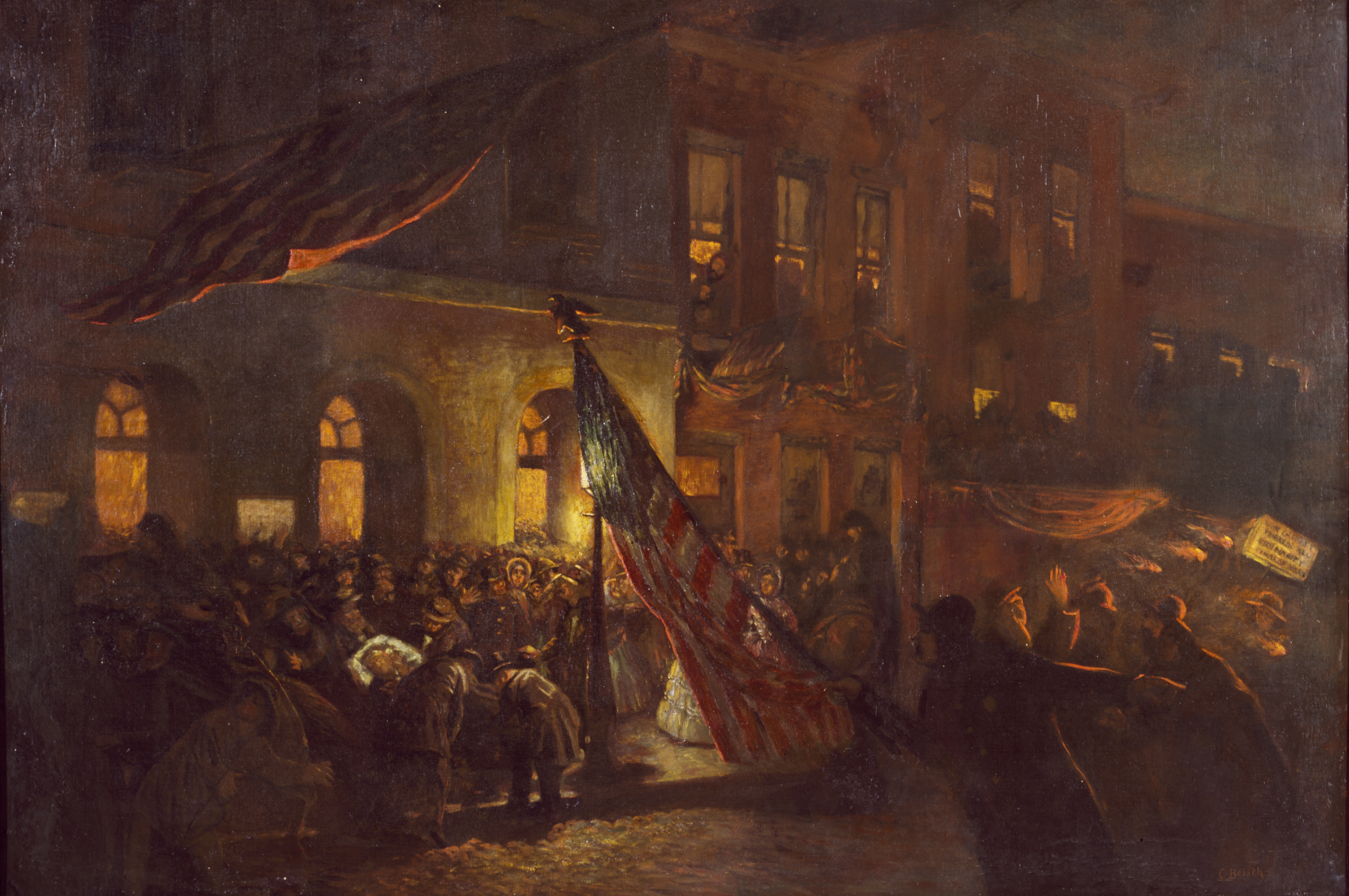
Lincoln Borne by Loving Hands

Bersch noticed a commotion in the area of the theatre door. As a group brought the president's body towards William Petersen's boardinghouse, Bersch sketched the "solemn and reverent cortege." Later, he expanded the sketch into an oil painting that he titled Lincoln Borne by Loving Hands. It is the only known visual that recorded the end-of-war celebration that was overtaken by the news of Lincoln's murder.

=== Later years and death ===
After the Civil War, he returned to Baltimore in 1865. In the same year he married Angelika Bode, the daughter of a German doctor, with whom he had a daughter. At the end of 1866 Carl Bersch received American citizenship. The portrait painting remained his specialty, in addition Bersch painted court scenes and operated as an inventor. About 1900 he returned to Washington DC. He visited Europe in 1906–1907 and remained in Baltimore, after this, for the rest of his life. On May 1, 1914 he died in Baltimore, Maryland.

== Works ==
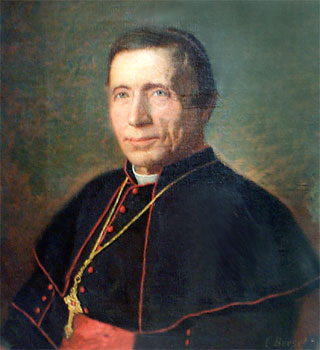
Portrait of James Gibbons

- Lincoln Borne by Loving Hands (Ford's Theatre, Washington, D.C.), 1865, 1,20m x 1,80m, Oil on canvas.
- "Portrait of Bismark".(Walters Art Museum, Baltimore), 1860, Oil on cardboard
- Portrait of James Cardinal Gibbons (Maryland Historical Society), 1890, Oil on canvas
