= St. Charles Township =

St. Charles Township or Saint Charles Township may refer to the following places in the United States:

- St. Charles Township, Kane County, Illinois
- Saint Charles Township, Floyd County, Iowa
- St. Charles Township, Michigan, in Saginaw County
- St. Charles Township, Winona County, Minnesota
- St. Charles Township, Cuming County, Nebraska

== See also ==
- Saint Charles (disambiguation)
