= Tugaya, Bukidnon =

Barangay in Bukidnon, Philippines

Tugaya
- Barangay
- Interactive map of Tugaya
- Coordinates: 7°54′52″N 125°01′04″E
- Country: Philippines
- Region: Region X
- Province: Bukidnon
- District: 2nd District
- City: Valencia City

Government
  - Type: Barangay
- Time zone: UTC+8 (PST)
- Postal Code: 8709

Tugaya is one of the 31 barangays of Valencia City, Bukidnon. It is bounded by Mount Nebo in the northwest, Lurogan in the north, Barobo in the east, and Guinoyuran in the south.
