= Lurugan, Bukidnon =

Coordinates: 7°58′N 125°03′E

Lurugan Lurogan
- Barangay
- Interactive map of Lurugan
- Country: Philippines
- Region: Region X
- Province: Bukidnon
- District: 2nd District
- City: Valencia City

Government
  - Type: Barangay
- Time zone: UTC+8 (PST)
- Postal Code: 8709

Lurugan is one of the 31 barangays of Valencia City, Bukidnon. It is bounded by Mount Nebo in the west, San Carlos in the east, the municipality of Lantapan in the north, and Tugaya and Barobo in the south.

During the American Occupation of the Philippines, this area was part of Lurugan Valley, where the first Secretary of the Interior, Dean C. Worcester, established his own ranch in 1921. This was aside from the 10,000 hectares he acquired near Diklum for AMPHILCO (American Philippine Company). After his death, his son Frederick managed the ranch. Based on the topography of the place, Lurugan Valley also included Kisalom, which is now part of Mountain View College.

It was described in 1922 by the Bureau of Agriculture as having a "billowy plain" to its east towards Mailag, "more pronounced hills covered with heavy cogon and secondary forests" to its southwest up to Guinoyuran, and a "wide belt of virgin forest" to its northwest.
