= Carlo Borromeo (disambiguation) =

Carlo Borromeo is the Italian name of Charles Borromeo (1538–1584), Archbishop of Milan and Catholic saint.

Carlo Borromeo may also refer to:

- Carlo Borromeo (bishop) (died 1540), Roman Catholic prelate
- Luigi Carlo Borromeo (1893–1975), Italian bishop of the Roman Catholic Diocese of Pesaro

== See also ==
- San Carlo Borromeo (disambiguation)
