= Georg Christian Crollius =

German historian and librarian

- Born: 21 July 1728; Zweibrücken
- Died: 23 March 1790 (aged 61); Zweibrücken

Academic work
- Discipline: History

Georg Christian Crollius (21 July 1728 – 23 March 1790) was a German historian and librarian.

He was born in Zweibrücken, the son of the gymnasial headmaster Johann Philipp Crollius and Margaretha Gabriela Joannis. Crollius studied in Halle and Göttingen. He succeeded his father in the management of the Herzog-Wolfgang-Gymnasium in Zweibrücken, the most renowned school in Palatinate-Zweibrücken. Duke Christian IV appointed him also to the committee of the library, the present-day Bibliotheca Bipontina, and to court historiographer. Similar to his father he researched the history of Palatinate-Zweibrücken and of the Rhenish County Palatine. As a member of the Mannheim academy (since 1765) he wrote several essays, which were printed in the series of the academy. The Origines Bipontinae (1761–1769) might be cited as his main work. Starting in 1779 he contributed also to the Editiones Bipontinae. He died in his home town of Zweibrücken.
