= San Carlos River =

San Carlos River may refer to:

- San Carlos River (Argentina), a river of Mendoza Province
- San Carlos River (Costa Rica)
- San Carlos River (Falkland Islands)
- San Carlos River (Panama), a river of Panama
- San Carlos River (Paraguay)
- San Carlos River (United States)
- San Carlos River (Venezuela), a river of Venezuela

== See also ==
- San Carlos Water, a bay in the Falkland Islands
