= Zweibrücken =

- Town
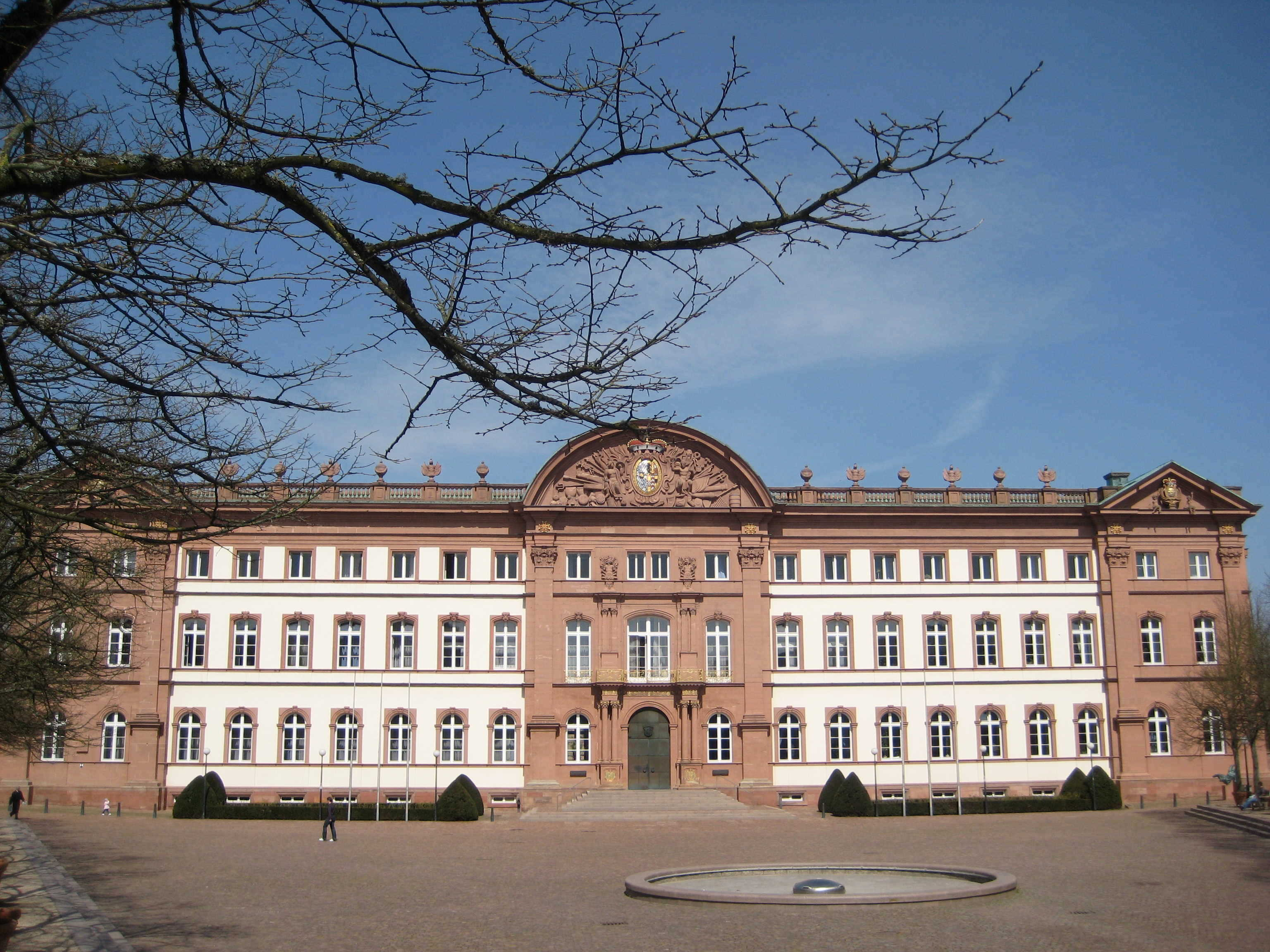
- Zweibrücken Castle

- Flag Coat of arms
- Interactive map of Zweibrücken
- Location within Germany Location within Rhineland-Palatinate
- Coordinates: 49°15′N 7°22′E
- Country: Germany
- State: Rhineland-Palatinate
- District: Urban district

Government
  - Mayor (2018–26): Marold Wosnitza (SPD)

Area
  - Total: 70.64 km^{2} (27.27 sq mi)
- Elevation: 300 m (980 ft)

Population (2025-12-31)
  - Total: 33,178
  - Density: 469.7/km^{2} (1,216/sq mi)
- Time zone: UTC+01:00 (CET)
  - Summer (DST): UTC+02:00 (CEST)
- Postal codes: 66482
- Dialling codes: 06332
- Vehicle registration: ZW
- Website: www.zweibruecken.de

Zweibrücken (German: [ˈtsvaɪˌbʁʏkŋ̍]; French: Deux-Ponts [dø pɔ̃]; Palatine German: Zweebrigge [ˈtsʋeːbʁɪgə]; literally translated as "Two Bridges") is a town in Rhineland-Palatinate, Germany, on the Schwarzbach River.

== Name ==
The name Zweibrücken means "two bridges"; older forms of the name include Middle High German Zweinbrücken, Latin Geminus Pons and Bipontum, and French Deux-Ponts, all with the same meaning.

== History ==
The town was the capital of the former Imperial State of Palatine Zweibrücken owned by the House of Wittelsbach. The ducal castle is now occupied by the high court of the Palatinate (Oberlandesgericht). There is a fine Gothic Protestant church, Alexander's church, founded in 1493 and rebuilt in 1955.

From the end of the 12th century, Zweibrücken was the seat of the County of Zweibrücken, the counts being descended from Henry I, youngest son of Simon I, Count of Saarbrücken (d. 1182). The line became extinct on the death of Count Eberhard II (1394), who in 1385 had sold half his territory to the Count Palatine of the Rhine, and held the other half as his feudal domain. Louis (d. 1489), son of Stephen, founded the line of the House of Palatinate-Zweibrücken. In 1533, Wolfgang, Count Palatine of Zweibrücken converted Palatine Zweibrücken to the new Protestant faith. In 1559, Wolfgang founded the earliest grammar school in the town (Herzog-Wolfgang-Gymnasium), which lasted until 1987.

When Charles X Gustav, the son of John Casimir, Count Palatine of Kleeburg, succeeded his cousin, Queen Christina of Sweden, on the Swedish throne, Palatinate-Zweibrücken was in personal union with Sweden, a situation that lasted until 1718.

Starting in 1680, Louis XIV's Chambers of Reunion awarded Zweibruecken and other localities to France, but under the 1697 Treaty of Rijswijk, "The Duchy of Zweibruecken was restored to the King of Sweden, as Count Palatine of the Rhine."

In 1731, Palatinate-Zweibrücken passed to the Palatinate-Birkenfeld-Zweibrücken branch of the counts palatine, from where it came under the sway of Bavaria in 1799. It was occupied by France in 1793 and on 4 November 1797, Zweibrücken became a canton centre in department of Mont Tonnerre. At the Peace of Lunéville in 1801, the French annexation of Zweibrücken was confirmed; on its reunion with Germany in 1814 the greater part of the territory was given to Bavaria, the remainder to Oldenburg and Prussia. The town of Zweibrücken became part of the Palatine region of the Kingdom of Bavaria.

At the ducal printing office at Zweibrücken the fine series of the classical editions known as the Bipontine Editions was published (1779 sqq.).

In 1848, the estimated population was 7,300 inhabitants.

The last prominent social event before the First World War was the inauguration of the Rosengarten (rose garden) by Princess Hildegard of Bavaria in June 1914. As a consequence of the First World War, Zweibrücken was occupied by French troops between 1918 and 1930. In the course of the Kristallnacht in 1938, Zweibrücken's synagogue was destroyed. On the outbreak of the World War II, the town was evacuated in 1939–1940, as it lay in the "Red Zone" on the fortified Siegfried Line. Shortly before the end of the war, on 14 March 1945, the town was nearly destroyed in an air raid by the Royal Canadian Air Force, with the loss of more than 200 lives. On 20 March, American ground troops reached Zweibrücken. The town became part of the new state of Rhineland-Palatinate after the war.

In 1993, the town underwent a major change. With the departure of the Americans, the military area became free, which corresponded altogether to a third of the entire urban area. Unemployment increased to approximately 21%, leading to a decrease in demand in the retail trade of approximately 25%.

== Geography ==
Zweibrücken is in the Southwestern portion of the Western Palatinate, bordering the state of Saarland. It is about 26 kilometres (16 mi) from Pirmasens, 40 kilometres (25 mi) from Saarbrücken and 55 kilometres (34 mi) from Kaiserslautern. The town stretches about 15 kilometres (9.3 mi) north to south and about 10 kilometres (6.2 mi) east-west.

== Mayors and Lord Mayors ==
- 1895–1904 Wolff
- 1905–1905 Freudenberg
- 1905–1932 Roesinger
- 1932–1945 Karl Ernst Collofong (NSDAP)
- 1945–1959 Ignaz Roth (1894–1972) (SPD)
- 1959–1969 Oskar Munzinger (1911–1983) (SPD)
- 1969–1979 Helmut Fichtner (SPD)
- 1980–1992 Werner von Blon (1929–2009) (SPD)
- 1993–1999 Hans Otto Streuber (born 1949) (SPD)
- 1999–2004 Jürgen Lambert (born 1936) (CDU)
- 2004–2012 Helmut Reichling (CDU)
- 2012–2018 Kurt Pirmann (1955–2018) (SPD)
- since 2018 Marold Wosnitza (born 1965) (SPD)

== Economy ==
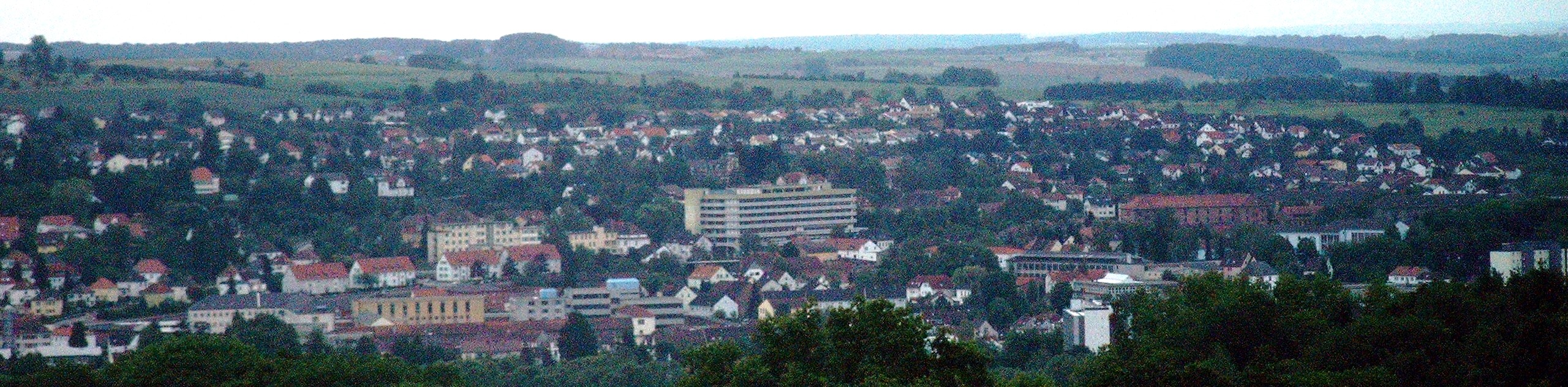
Panorama of modern Zweibrücken

Weaving, brewing and the manufacture of machinery, chicory, cigars, malt, boots, furniture and soap were the chief industries before World War II. Nowadays, Terex cranes and bulldozers and John Deere harvesting equipment are the chief industries.

The Hochschule Kaiserslautern , one of the largest universities in the Rhineland-Palatinate with about 6,300 students, has one of its three campuses in Zweibrücken.

== Culture and sights ==
The city of Zweibrücken is represented at various cultural events by the Rose Queen, who is elected every two years.

=== Parks ===
Zweibrücken has one of the largest Rosariums in the World with 45000 Plants and 1500 Species. It consists of 2 gardens with the main garden having an area of 50.000 square meters. The second, smaller garden is accessible without an entry fee and is located at the Fasanerie and contains Wild Rose plants. The city is sometimes known as the "Rose City".

=== Museums ===
The Zweibrücken City Museum has a permanent exhibition in the former residence of court gardener Ernst August Bernhard Petri, documenting the eventful history of Zweibrücken. In addition, special exhibitions take place regularly, e.g. on the occasion of the 200th anniversary of the State Stud.

=== Libraries ===
The Bibliotheca Bipontina is a scientific regional library in Zweibrücken, whose holdings mainly go back to rescued parts of the ducal libraries and therefore partly houses very valuable first editions from the 16th century. It is part of the Landesbibliothekszentrum Rheinland-Pfalz (Rhineland-Palatinate State Library Centre) and one of the most important old holdings libraries in the state. The Bibliotheca Bipontina is housed in the building of the Helmholtz-Gymnasium Zweibrücken. The Zweibrücken City Library, which has existed since 1903, is housed in an adjoining building of the town hall and has a stock of around 50,000 volumes. Branches are the youth library and the Rimschweiler branch.

=== Buildings ===
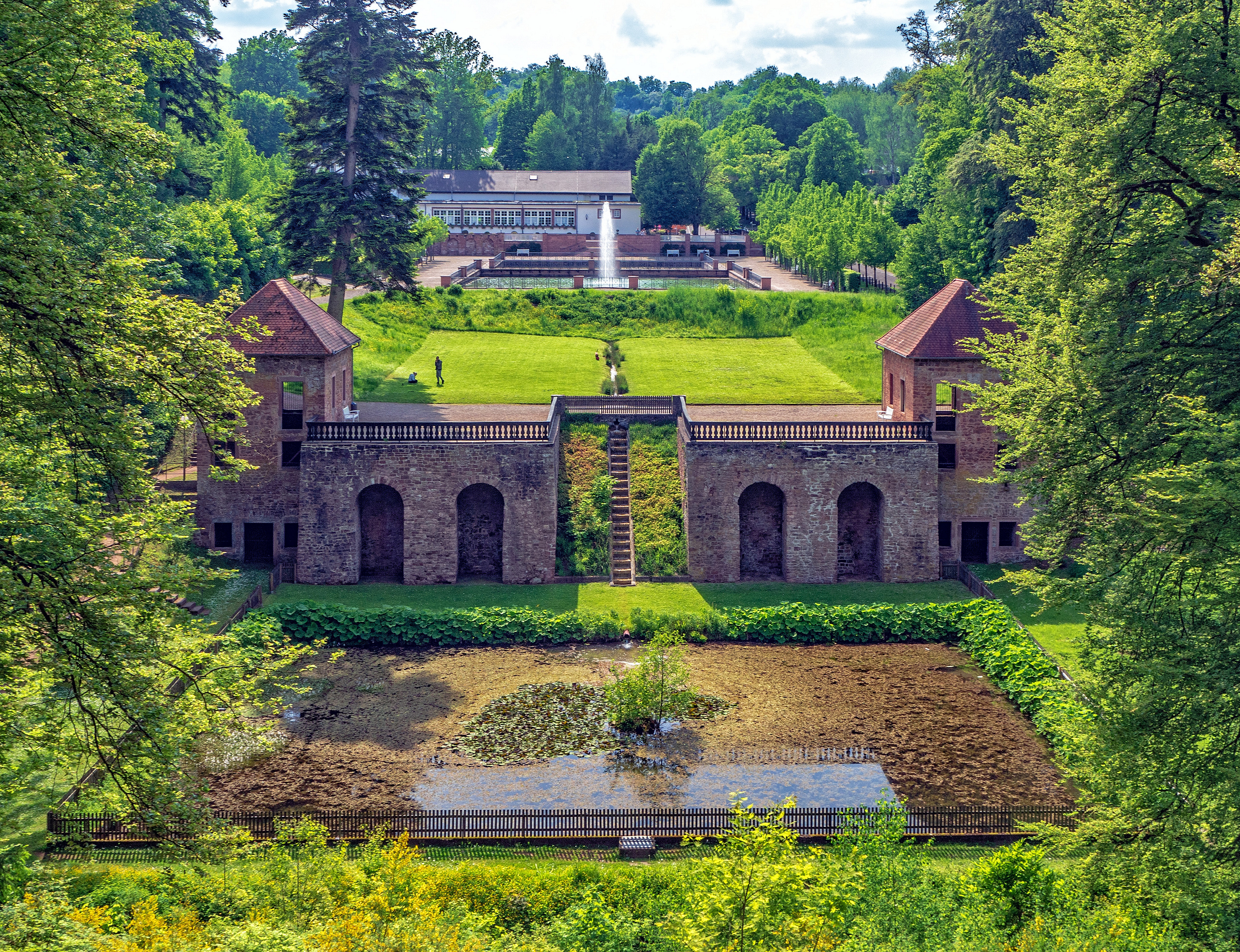
Lustschloss Tschifflik, built in early 18th century by Polish King Stanisław Leszczyński

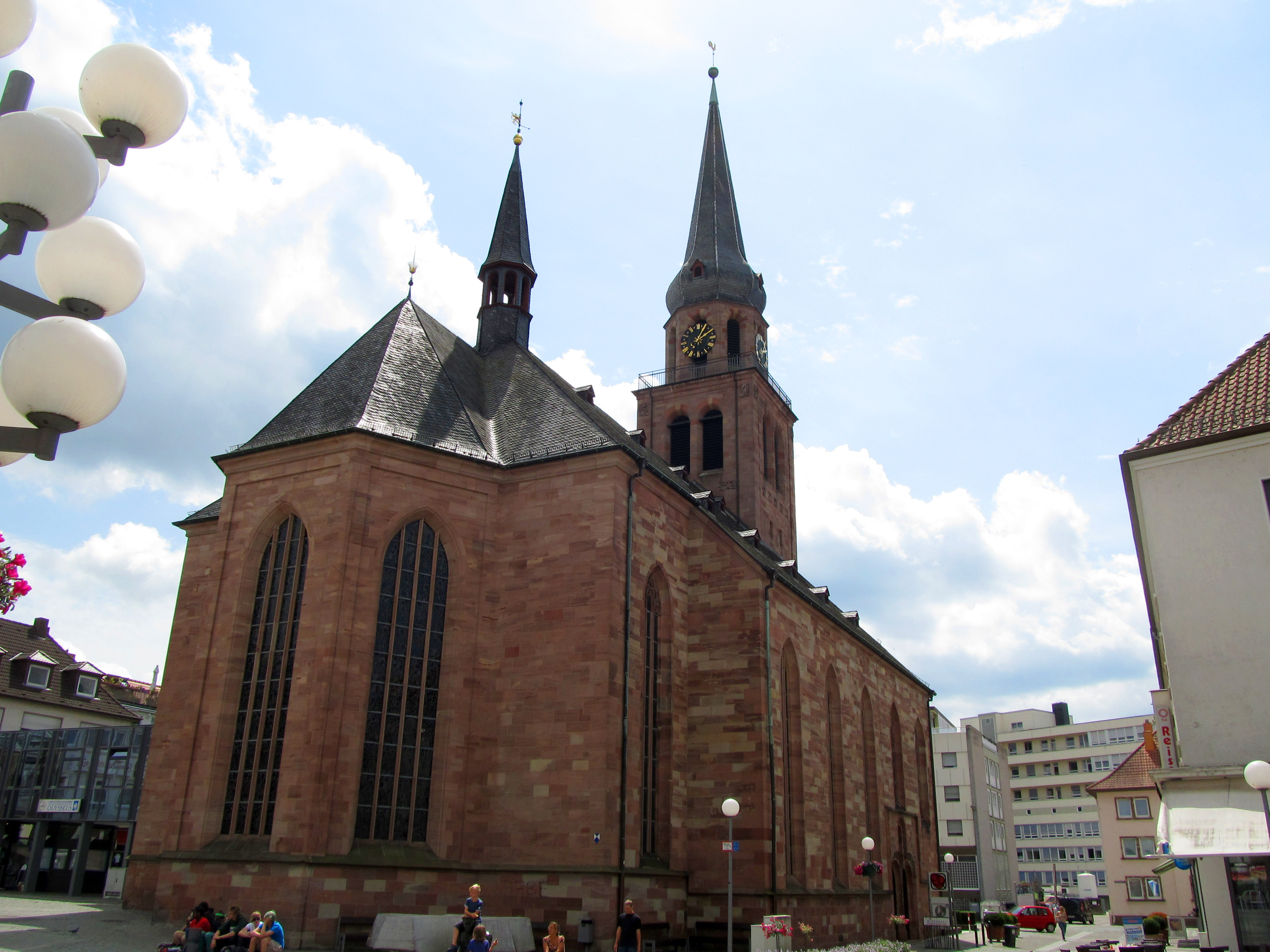
Alexanderskirche, built in late 15th century by Alexander, Count Palatine of Zweibrücken

- Das Schloss Zweibrücken – the Zweibrücken Castle, built in its present form in 1725, is the largest Palatine secular building in the Baroque style of Nordic coinage. It was built in 1720–1725 by master builder Jonas Erikson Sundahl and is the former residence of the Dukes of Zweibrücken. Destroyed in World War II, it was rebuilt in 1965 and is now the seat of the Palatinate Higher Regional Court
- Herzogvorstadt – The so-called Herzogvorstadt consists of several baroque buildings built between 1762 and 1772. The entire complex is based on plans by Christian Ludwig Hautt. The buildings, which were not destroyed during the last war, house the city administration, the district court, the city archive and the city museum
- Alexanderskirche – Alexander's Church (Alexanderskirche) is the oldest church in Zweibrücken, whose crypt is the burial place of numerous counts/dukes of the House of Palatinate-Zweibrücken. A late-Gothic Protestant hall church, construction began in 1493, as a gift from Alexander, Count Palatine of Zweibrücken on his return from a pilgrimage to the Holy Land.
- Karlskirche – Charles' Church was built between 1708 and 1711 by the architect Haquinus Schlang from Sweden on behalf of the Swedish King Charles XII in his capacity as Duke of Zweibrücken. After its destruction in the Second World War, it was rebuilt as a community centre on the basis of the original plans and reopened on 1 November 1970
- Heilig Kreuz Kirche – The third church in the inner city is the Heilig-Kreuz-Kirche, which was built much later than the other two churches
- Gasthaus "Zum Hirsch" – The former guesthouse is the oldest building in the city centre
- Villa Ipser – Built in 1908 for a shoe manufacturer, Villa Ipser is situated on the Rothenberg and features typical late historicist architecture with clear Art Nouveau influences
- Zweibrücker Stollen und Felsenkeller
- Himmelsbergstollen – The Himmelsbergstollen is a cellar complex carved into the sandstone on the Himmelsberg, in the southern part of the city centre
- Zweibrücken Observatory - an observatory at the university
- Lustschloss Tschifflik/Fasanerie - built by Polish King Stanisław Leszczyński. The complex is inspired by time the monarch spent in Bessarabia, hence the Turkish name Tschifflik. The paintings of King Stanisław, his wife Katharina as well as his two daughters Anna and Maria adorn the walls of the fireplace room.

== Zweibrücken Air Base ==
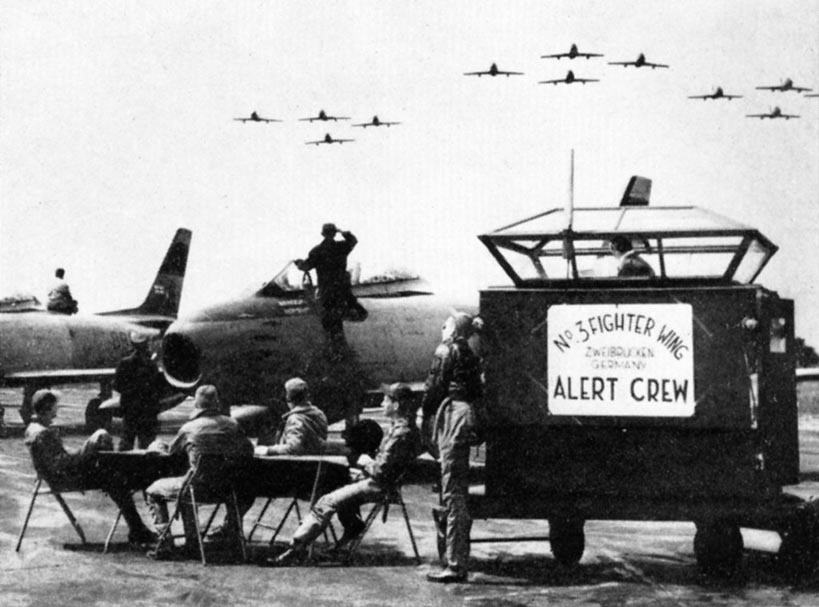
Alert crew at RCAF Station Zweibrücken waiting to scramble as Sabres fly overhead

On the outskirts of the town, Zweibrücken Air Base was home during the Cold War to the Royal Canadian Air Force (RCAF) until early 1969, then to the United States Air Forces in Europe (USAFE) from 1969. The RCAF stationed No. 3 Fighter Wing of No.1 Canadian Air Division at Zweibrücken AB. During the years 1953 to 1968, it was the home to the RCAF's 413, 427 and 434 Fighter Squadrons flying F-86 Sabre jets, and 440 Squadron, which flew the CF-100 Canuck, then the CF-104 Starfighter. When the RCAF transferred the wing 100 km (62 mi) southeast to CFB Baden–Soellingen, the USAFE moved onto the base with Phantom RF-4C aircraft, under the 38th Tactical Reconnaissance Squadron of the 26th Tactical Reconnaissance Wing. These were photo-reconnaissance aircraft with missions all over Europe and used in Operation Desert Storm.

The Short C-23 Sherpa, a small prop-driven transport plane, also flew out of the base in the 1980s under the 10th Military Airlift Squadron, a tenant Military Airlift Command unit. The squadron's mission was to deliver high-priority aircraft parts to bases in USAFE to ensure a maximum number of aircraft were combat-ready. Today Zweibrücken Air Base has been transformed into the modern Zweibrücken Airport, an international airport with flights to Palma de Mallorca, Antalya, Gran Canaria, Teneriffe, Rhodos, Heraklion and Fuerteventura (TUIfly), Istanbul (Pegasus Airlines).

On the other side of the town was Kreuzberg Kaserne, home to various units of the United States Army. Only one combat unit was located there: Battery A, 2nd Battalion, 60th Air Defense Artillery, with its Headquarters and Headquarters Battery (HHB) at Ramstein Air Base. The 3d Battalion, 60th ADA was a subordinate unit of the 32nd Army Air Defense Command. Major tenants at Kreuzberg Kaserne were USAISEC-EUR (Information Systems Engineering Command - Europe) and the USA MATCOMEUR (Material Command, Europe), later renamed the US Army Material Management Agency, Europe. During the US military draw down in the 1990s, control of the Air Base was transferred to the Bundeswehr. The base's housing toward the center of the city and Kreuzberg itself were eventually also transferred to the German government by the mid-1990s.

== Transport ==
Zweibrücken is situated at the Landau-Rohrbach railway and offsets hourly connections to Saarbrücken. This line is operated by DB Regio Mitte with currently DMU's of the Class 642 (Siemens Desiro Classic). The public transport is operated by Stadtbus Zweibrücken GmbH, a Transdev Germany company, with currently eight bus lines (221-226, 228 and 229 on saturday from 2 p.m. and sundays). The company is integrated in the Verkehrsverbund Rhein-Neckar (VRN). The bus service operates from 5:00 a.m. to 8:00 p.m. on weekdays, on weekends the times are changed depending on the requirements. On Sunday, the bus service does not start until 2:00 p.m. and is then only provided with lines 225 and 229. The end of operations is then 7:30 p.m. The fleet consists of 10 MAN Lion's City city buses from 2020, and 4 articulated buses Mercedes-Benz Citaro G and a further 3 MAN Lion's City buses are available for school buses and booster traffic in the rush hour.

== Motorsport ==
The 2.790 km layout used by the circuit

From 1996 to 1999, a temporary circuit at Zweibrucken Airport held various rounds of the Super Tourenwagen Cup and the German F3 Championship. The track still hosts historic racing events as recently as September 3, 2020

== Climate ==
Climate in this area has mild differences between highs and lows, and there is adequate rainfall year-round. The Köppen Climate Classification subtype for this climate is "Cfb" (Marine West Coast Climate/Oceanic climate).

Climate data for Zweibrücken
Month	Jan	Feb	Mar	Apr	May	Jun	Jul	Aug	Sep	Oct	Nov	Dec	Year
Mean daily maximum °C (°F)	3 (37)	4 (39)	9 (48)	12 (53)	17 (63)	20 (68)	22 (72)	22 (72)	19 (66)	13 (56)	7 (45)	4 (39)	13 (55)
Mean daily minimum °C (°F)	−1 (31)	−1 (30)	2 (36)	4 (40)	8 (47)	12 (53)	14 (57)	13 (56)	11 (51)	7 (45)	3 (37)	1 (33)	6 (43)
Average precipitation days	21	16	19	15	16	16	13	12	13	16	17	20	194
Source: Weatherbase

== Twin towns – sister cities ==
Zweibrücken is twinned with:

- Barrie, Canada (1997)
- Boulogne-sur-Mer, France (1959)
- Yorktown, United States (1978)

== Notable people ==
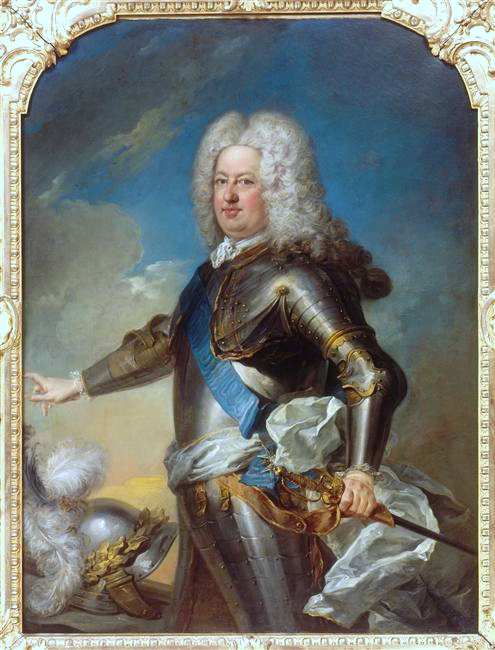
Stanisław Leszczyński

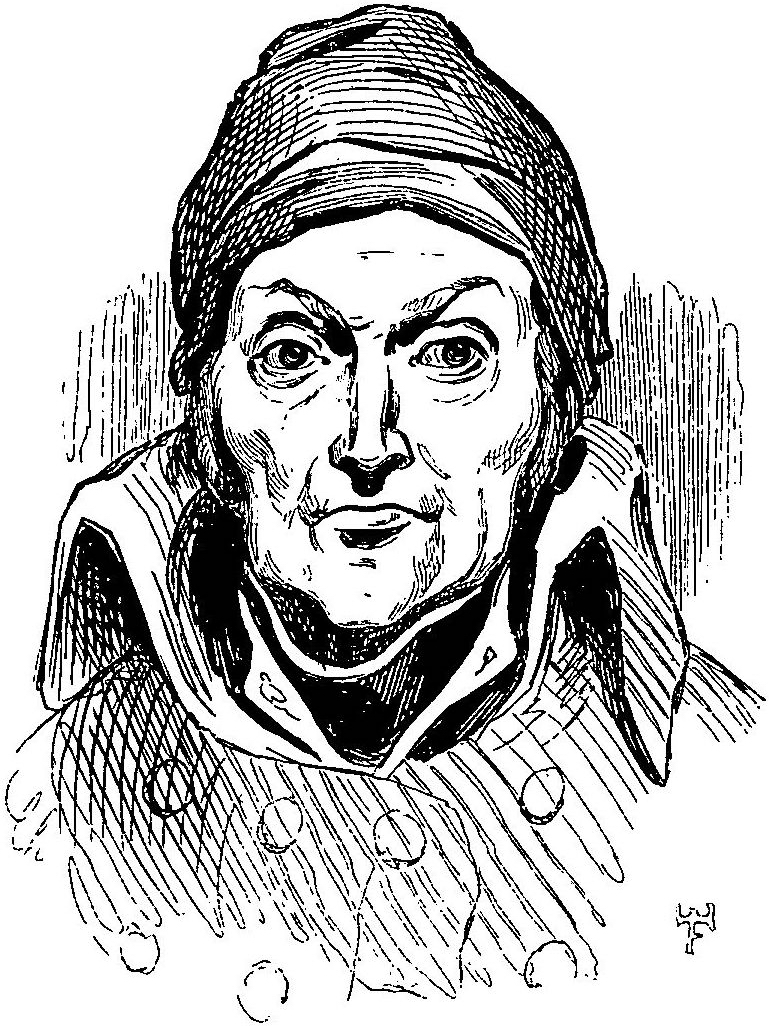
Nicolas Appert, 1841

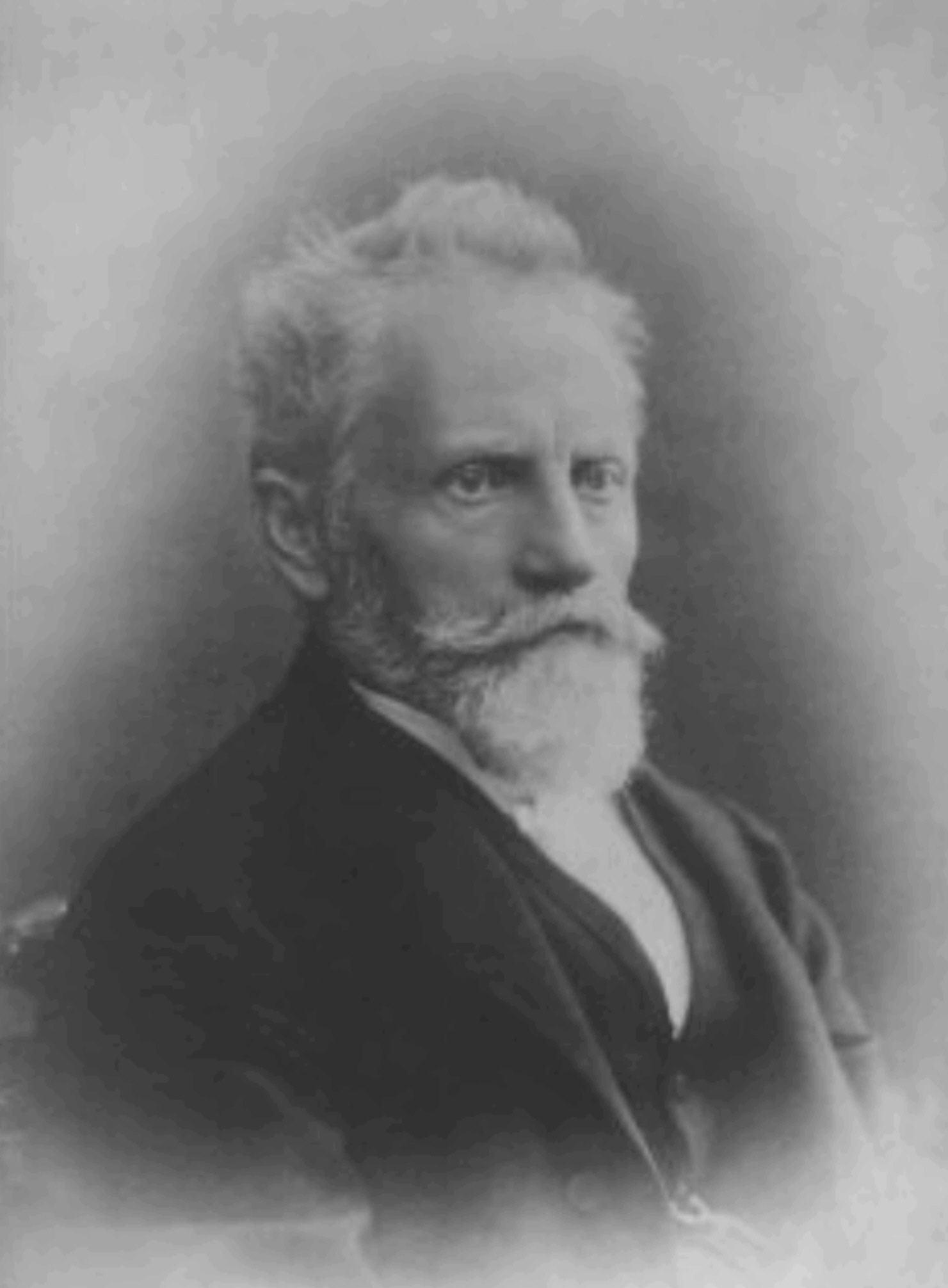
Hermann Dingler around 1910

- Stanisław Leszczyński (1677–1766), King of Poland, Grand Duke of Lithuania, Duke of Lorraine and a count of the Holy Roman Empire
- Jonas Erikson Sundahl (1678–1762), Swedish-born architect who designed Zweibrücken Castle
- Georg Christian Crollius (1728–1790), historian and librarian
- Johan Ludvig Mansa (1740–1820), Danish gardener and castellan
- Friedrich Wilhelm Schultz (1804–1876), pharmacist and botanist
- Carl Heinrich "Bipontinus" Schultz (1805–1867), physician and botanist
- Philipp Ludwig von Seidel (1821–1896), mathematician and astronomer
- Eugene W. Hilgard (1833–1916), soil scientist, geologist and agronomist
- Carl Bersch (1834–1914), artist
- Hermann Dingler (1846–1935), botanist
- Gustav Aschaffenburg (1866–1944), psychiatrist
- Maximilian Schuler (1882–1972), engineer, mechanical engineer and physicist
- Emil Oberholzer (1883–1958), Swiss psychiatrist and psychoanalyst
- Johann Fortner (1884–1947), officer of the Armed Forces
- August Heinrich Bruinier (1897–1970), violinist
- Otto Bradfisch (1903–1994), economist, jurist and SS-Obersturmbannführer
- Otto Carius (1922–2015), pharmacist, tank commander in WW II
- Peter Fleischmann (1937–2021), film director
- Charlotte Lehmann (born 1938), concert singer and singing teacher
- Ron MacLean (born 1960), Canadian sportswriter
- Rainer Schönborn (born 1962), ice dancer
- Larry Mitchell (born 1967), ice hockey player
- Nico Zimmermann (born 1985), footballer
- Christin Hussong (born 1994), javelin thrower

=== Worked in Zweibrücken ===
- Hieronymus Bock (1498–1554), significant physician and botanist
- Pantaleon Candidus (1540–1608), reformed theologian, historian and author
- Nicolas Appert (1749–1841), confectioner and inventor
- Jakob Weis (1879–1948), prison pastor in Zweibrücken 1909–1921, divisional chaplain in World War I, an author, 1925–1940 study professor at the secondary school or at school, 1940–1948 Emeritus in Zweibrücken, there he also died

== See also ==
- Palatine Zweibrücken#List of Counts Palatine Zweibrücken
- Bipont Editions
- Kaiserslautern Military Community
