= Zweibrücken Observatory =

Public observatory in Germany

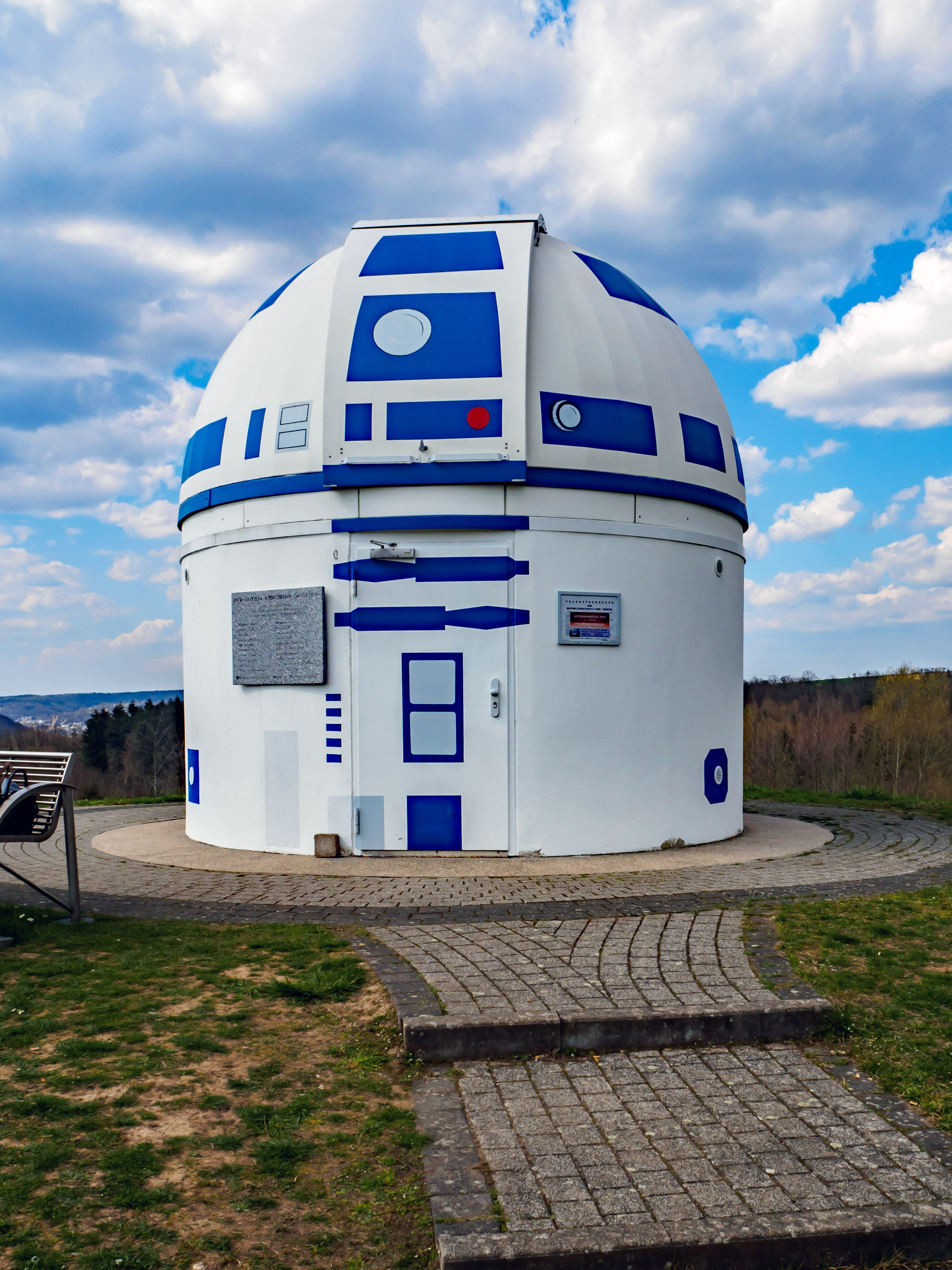
- Zweibrücken Observatory R2-D2 colour scheme (2019)
- Alternative names: Observatory of the Natural Science Association of Zweibrücken
- Location: Zweibrücken, Rhineland-Palatinate, Germany
- Coordinates: 49°15′41″N 7°21′34″E
- Altitude: 321 m (1,053 ft)
- Website: sternwarte-zweibruecken.de/en/
- Telescopes: refracting telescope; Schmidt–Cassegrain telescope; solar telescope
- Location of Zweibrücken Observatory
- Related media on Commons

Zweibrücken Observatory (German: Volkssternwarte Zweibrücken), or the Zweibrück Observatory of the Natural Science Association, is a public observatory in Zweibrücken, Germany. Its dome was painted to resemble the Star Wars character R2-D2 in 2018.

== Construction ==
The observatory is located on a hill in the Zweibrücken campus of the University of Applied Sciences, Kaiserslautern. In 1999, the Zweibrücken scientific association was founded, with plans to construct an observatory. In 2002 the 4.57 metres (15.0 ft) diameter dome was erected. The construction was an initiative of Professor Peter Pokrowsky.

The dome houses a Celestron C14 optical telescope, with a diameter of 14 inches (36 cm), as well as a Coronado SolarMax solar telescope with a diameter of 4 centimetres (1.6 in) and a focal length of 40 centimetres (16 in).

== R2-D2 ==
In September 2018, the telescope dome was painted to resemble the R2-D2 robot from Star Wars by a team led by Hubert Zitt. It was the second observatory dome to be painted in such a way, following from Goodsell Observatory in 2010. The repainting took 120 man-hours. It gained internet fame after a post on Twitter by Star Wars actor Mark Hamill.

== See also ==
- List of astronomical observatories
