= Lawrence Kermit White =

Director of the Central Intelligence Agency

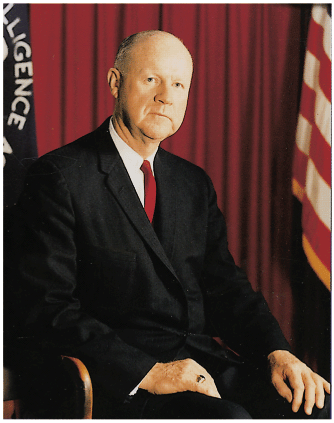
- Lawrence "Red" White
- Born: June 10, 1912; Tennessee, U.S.
- Died: April 5, 2006 (aged 93)
- Military career
- Allegiance: United States of America
- Branch: United States Army
- Service years: 1933–1947
- Rank: Colonel
- Nickname: "Red"
- Commands: 148th Infantry Regiment
- Conflicts: World War II
- Awards: Distinguished Service Cross; Silver Star; Legions of Merit (2); Bronze Star (3)
- Other work: Deputy Director, Central Intelligence Agency. Codename "Blue"

Colonel Lawrence Kermit "Red" White (June 10, 1912 – April 5, 2006) was an American army officer during World War II and later Director of the Foreign Broadcast Information Service, Deputy Director for Administration and Executive Director for the Central Intelligence Agency.

== Biography ==
White was the son of a Presbyterian minister in Tennessee, he earned money digging ditches at aged 16, before graduating from Troy High School in 1929 and was accepted at the United States Military Academy at West Point on 1 July 1929 with help from congressman Jerry Cooper. In September 1942 White was sent to serve in the Pacific theater of the Second World War, seeing combat in New Georgia, Bougainville and the Philippines. White earned a Distinguished Service Cross, a Silver Star, two Legions of Merit, and three Bronze Stars. Reaching the rank of colonel in the Philippines in 1945, he was severely wounded and had to be dragged to safety while under fire by US Army Chaplain Elmer Heindl. From 1945 until 1947 White recuperated in a number of US veterans hospitals.

After release, White joined the CIA in the Office of Operations, becoming head of the Foreign Broadcast Information Branch and by December 1950 Deputy Assistant Director of the Office of Operations. He was promoted again to Assistant to the Deputy Director for Administration in 1952 and to Deputy Director for Administration in 1954 by DCI Allen Dulles. In 1964, DCI William Raborn made White Executive Director-Comptroller until his retirement in 1972.
