= Karlskirche (disambiguation) =

Karlskirche is a baroque church in Vienna, Austria.

Karlskirche may also refer to:

- Karlskirche (Kassel), Protestant church in northern Hesse, Germany
- Karlskirche (Zweibrücken), church in Rhineland-Palatinate, Germany

== See also ==
- St. Charles' Church (disambiguation)
- Charles Borromeo Church (disambiguation)
