= San Carlos, Valencia =

Coordinates: 7°58′N 125°04′E

San Carlos
- Barangay
- Interactive map of San Carlos
- Country: Philippines
- Region: Region X
- Province: Bukidnon
- District: 2nd District
- City: Valencia City

Government
  - Type: Barangay
- Time zone: UTC+8 (PST)
- Postal Code: 8709

San Carlos is one of the 31 barangays of Valencia City, Bukidnon. It is bounded by Lurogan in the west, Bagontaas, Mailag, and Colonia in the east, Barobo in the south, and the Poblacion in the southeast.
