= St. Charles' Church =

St. Charles' Church may refer to:

- St. Charles's Church, Vienna, Austria
- St. Charles's Church (Staten Island, New York), United States
- St. Charles Anglican Cathedral, Bremerton, Washington, United States
- Charles Church, Plymouth, Devon, England
- St. Charles' Church, Tallinn, Estonia
- Saint-Charles Church, Monaco, Monte Carlo district, Monaco

== See also ==
- Charles Borromeo Church (disambiguation)
- Charles Church (disambiguation)
- Karlskirche (disambiguation)
