= San Vincenzo, Tuscany =

San Vincenzo
- Comune
- Comune di San Vincenzo
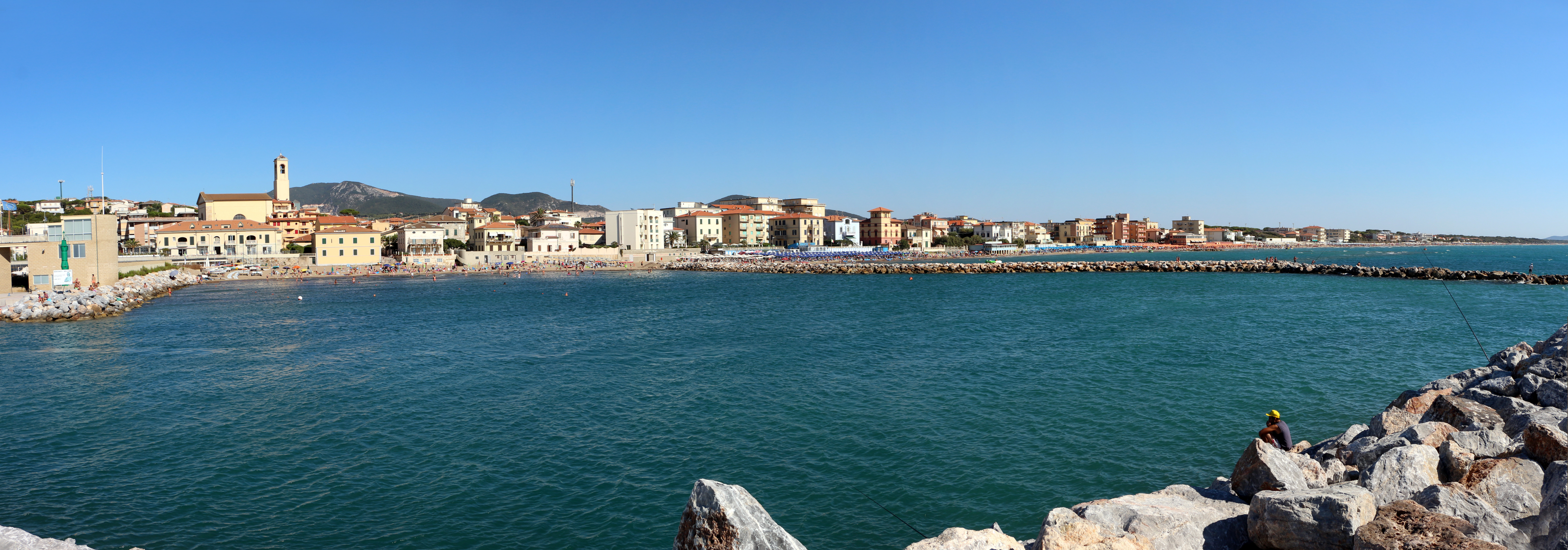
- San Vincenzo

- Location within Italy Location within Tuscany
- Coordinates: 43°5′N 10°32′E
- Country: Italy
- Region: Tuscany
- Province: Livorno (LI)
- Frazioni: San Carlo

Government
  - Mayor: Paolo Riccucci

Area
  - Total: 33.1 km^{2} (12.8 sq mi)
- Elevation: 5 m (16 ft)

Population (January 2017)
  - Total: 6,910
  - Density: 209/km^{2} (541/sq mi)
- Demonym: Sanvincenzini
- Time zone: UTC+1 (CET)
  - Summer (DST): UTC+2 (CEST)
- Postal code: 57027
- Dialing code: 0565
- Website: Official website

San Vincenzo (Italian pronunciation: [saɱ vinˈtʃɛntso]) is an Italian commune in the province of Livorno, a Tuscan town in central-Italy.

== Geography ==
San Vincenzo is located on the Ligurian Sea, about 50 kilometres (31 mi) southeast of Livorno and about 100 kilometres (62 mi) southwest of Florence, in the part of coast which stretches from Livorno to Piombino, also known as Etruscan coast (in Italian: Costa degli Etruschi). The town develops on the Maremma livornese and it is bounded in the north by the comune of Castagneto Carducci and in the south by Piombino and the Rimigliano Coastal Park.

== Monuments and landmarks ==
- Rimigliano Coastal Park
- Chiesa di San Vincenzo Ferrer
- Torre di San Vincenzo
- Torre Vecchia

== Recognitions ==
San Vincenzo is a seaside resort. In 2006 it received its first Blue Flag, awarded for its clear water, which was then also awarded from 2007 to 2023.

== Notable people ==
Walter Mazzarri, a football coach, former manager of Watford F.C. and former football player, was born in San Vincenzo in 1961.

== Twin towns ==
- Guanabo, Cuba
- Pfarrkirchen, Germany
- Saint-Maximin-la-Sainte-Baume, France
