= Karlskirche (Zweibrücken) =

Coordinates: 49°14′52″N 7°21′44″E

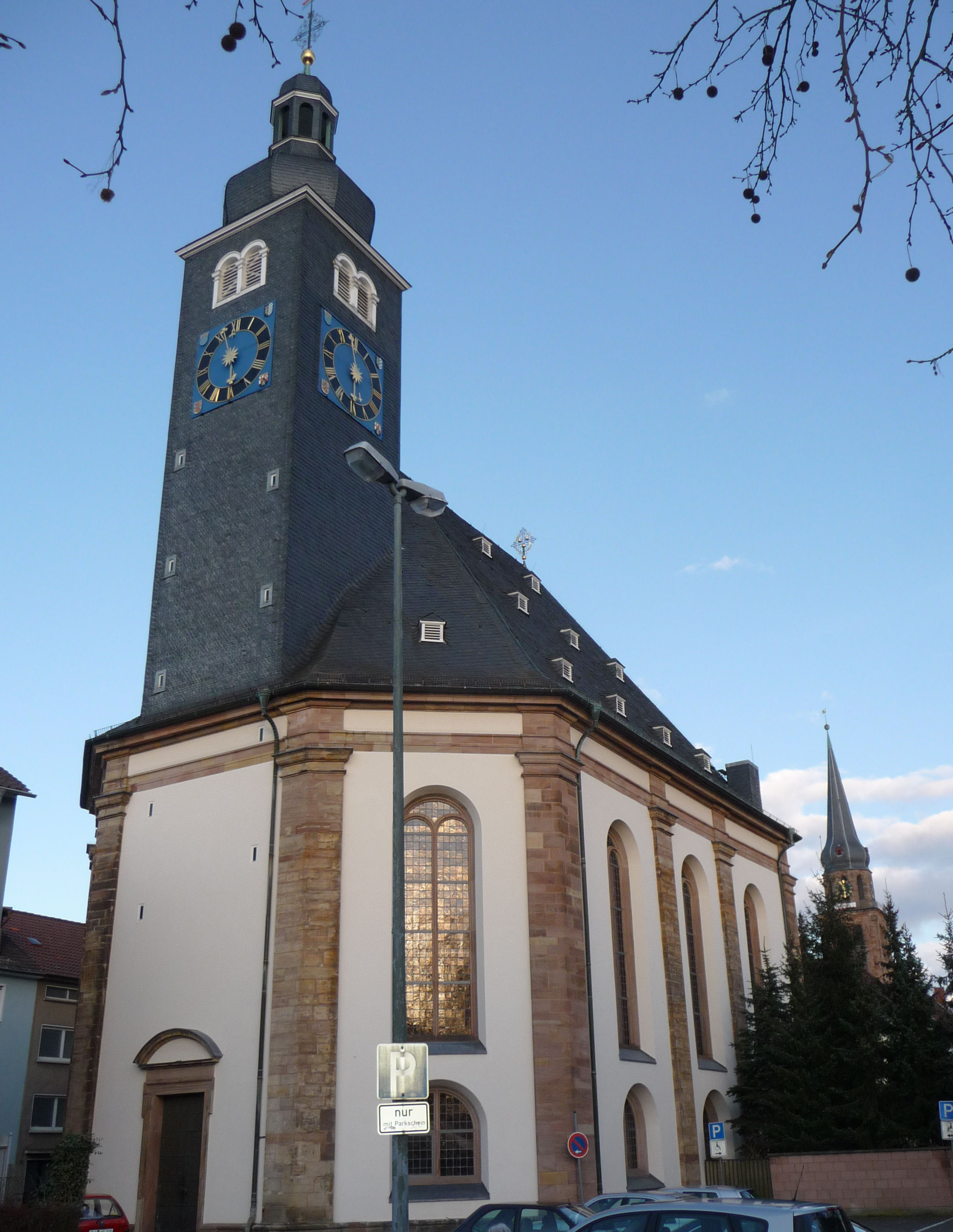
Karlskirche

The Karlskirche is a church in Zweibrücken built in 1715, destroyed in 1945, rebuilt in 1970. It is one of two landmarks of the town with Alexander's Church (Alexanderskirche, built 1493–1514). It was court church from 1733 to 1858. Its congregation forms part of today's United Evangelical Church of the Palatinate.

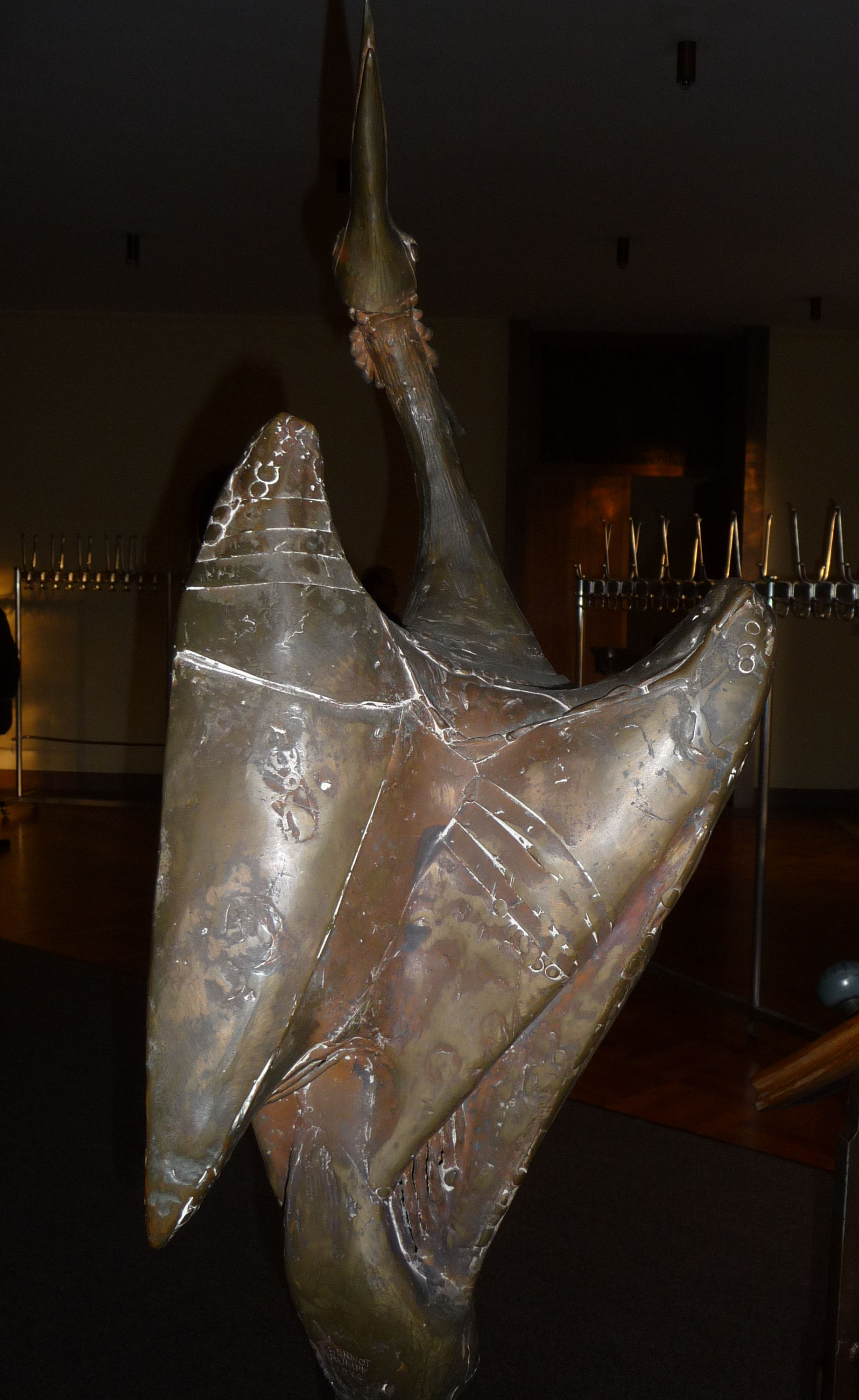
Phoenix in the entry hall
