= San Carlo, San Vincenzo =

San Carlo
- Frazione
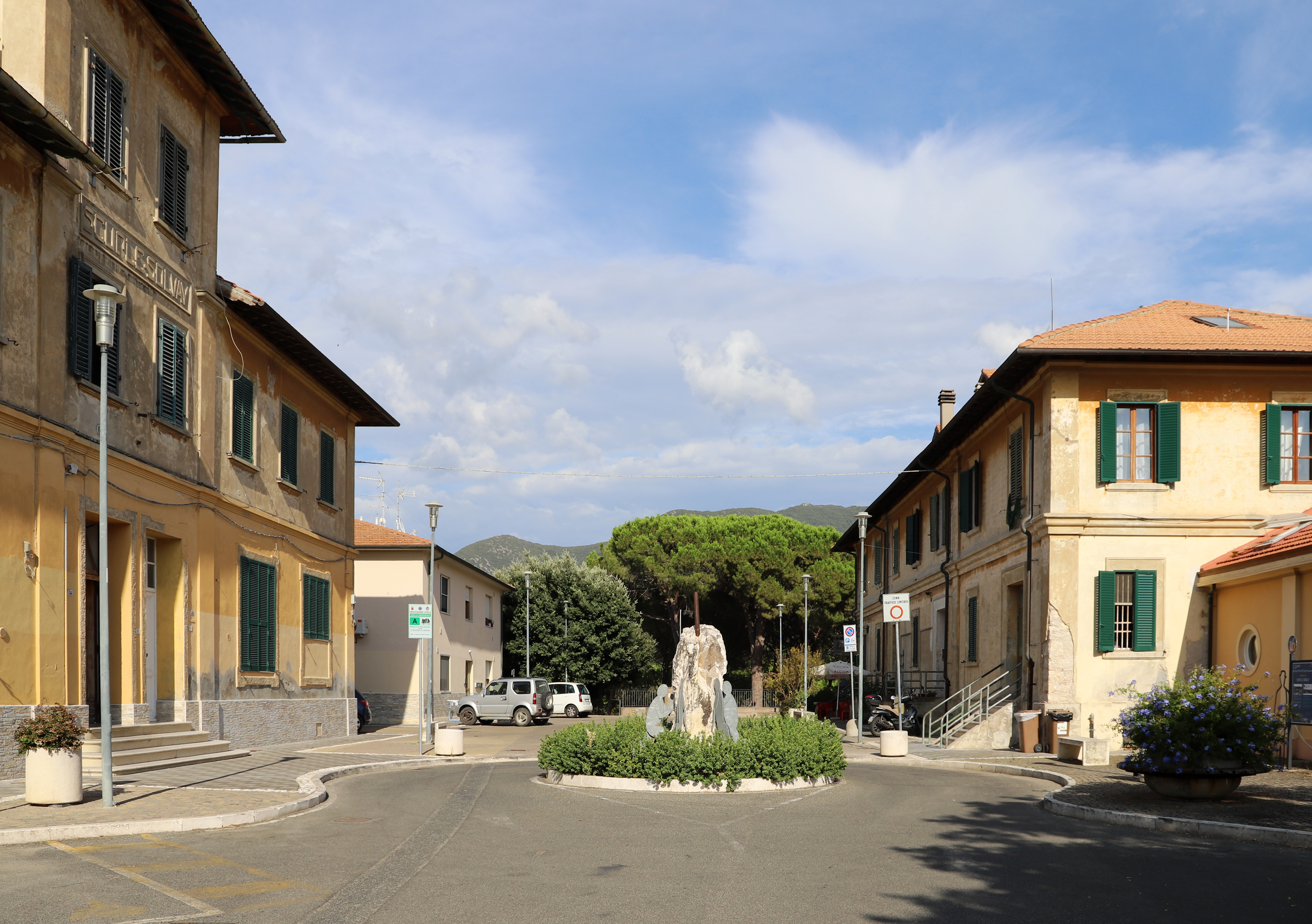

- Location of San Carlo in Italy
- Coordinates: 43°5′56″N 10°35′13″E
- Country: Italy
- Region: Tuscany
- Province: Livorno (LI)
- Comune: San Vincenzo
- Elevation: 174 m (571 ft)

Population (2011)
  - Total: 256
- Time zone: UTC+1 (CET)
  - Summer (DST): UTC+2 (CEST)
- Postal code: 57027
- Dialing code: (+39) 0565

San Carlo is a village in Tuscany, central Italy, administratively a frazione of the comune of San Vincenzo, province of Livorno. At the time of the 2011 census its population was 256.

The village is about 62 km from Livorno and 5 km from San Vincenzo.
