= Bipont Editions =

Texts of classical works

Bipont Editions (also known as the Bipontine Editions), the name of a famous series of editions, in 50 volumes, of Greek and Latin classical authors, so called from Bipontium, the modern Latin name of Zweibrücken (also referred to as "Deux Ponts"; English, "two bridges") in the Rhineland-Palatinate where they were first issued by the Societas Bipontina (under the supervision of Friedrich Christian Exter and Georg Christian Crollius) in 1779. Their place of publication was afterwards transferred to Strasbourg (referred to on the title pages by the Latin name of "Argentoratum").
