= Rancho San Carlos =

Rancho San Carlos may refer to:

- Rancho San Carlos de Jonata, a Mexican land grant in present-day Santa Barbara County, California, United States
- Santa Lucia Preserve, Monterey County, California, United States, formerly known as Rancho San Carlos
- Rancho San Carlos, an estate at San Carlos Nuevo Guaymas, a beachfront subdivision in Guayamas, Sonora, Mexico
- Rancho Potrero de San Carlos, a Mexican land grant in present-day Monterey County, California, United States
- Rancho San Carlos, an estate designed by Reginald Johnson in Santa Barbara County, California, United States
