= San Carlos Airport =

San Carlos Airport may refer to:

- San Carlos Airport, Mendoza in San Carlos, Mendoza, Argentina
- San Carlos Airport (Nicaragua) in San Carlos, Rio San Juan, Nicaragua
- San Carlos Airport (Venezuela) in San Carlos, Cojedes, Venezuela
- San Carlos Airport (California) in San Carlos, California, U.S.

== See also ==
- San Carlos Gutierrez Airport in the Beni Department of Bolivia
