= St. Charles Borromeo Church (Bridgeport, Connecticut) =

Coordinates: 41.1919°N 73.1817°W

- St. Charles Borromeo Church
- Location: 391 Ogden St; Bridgeport, Connecticut
- Country: United States
- Denomination: Roman Catholic

Administration
- Province: Hartford
- Diocese: Bridgeport

Clergy
- Bishop: Most Rev. William E. Lori

St. Charles Borromeo Parish is a Roman Catholic church located on the East Side neighborhood of Bridgeport, Connecticut, part of the Diocese of Bridgeport.

The church was founded in 1902 by Irish immigrants. Its architecture is Gothic Revival.

St. Charles Borromeo has masses in different languages, such as Spanish, Portuguese, French-Creole and English.
