= San Carlos River (Paraguay) =

Location
- Country: Paraguay

Physical characteristics
- Mouth: Paraguay River
  - location: near Puerto Pinasco, Paraguay
  - coordinates: 22°47′37″S 57°53′34″W
- Length: 68 km (42 mi)

The San Carlos River (Spanish: Río San Carlos) is a river located in the Alto Paraguay Department of Paraguay.
