= Jim Churchill =

American businessman, restaurateur and police captain (1863–1930)

James "Big Jim" Churchill
- Born: James Churchill; 1863; New York City, New York state, United States
- Died: January 19, 1930 (aged 67); Atlantic City, New Jersey, United States
- Occupation: Businessman
- Known for: New York restaurateur and owner of the popular Broadway restaurant-cabaret club "Churchill's".
- Spouse: Anna Churchill
- Children: 3

James Churchill (1863 – January 19, 1930) was an American businessman, restaurateur and NYPD police captain. He was the founder of the Broadway restaurant-cabaret club "Churchill's", located on Forty-Ninth Street, which became one of the most popular establishments in New York City for over a decade prior to Prohibition.

== Biography ==
Jim Churchill was born in Manhattan, New York in 1863. He was raised on Forty-Ninth Street, just "two steps off Broadway", and left elementary school at 4th grade to go to work. At age 21, he joined the New York City Police Department and was assigned to Chinatown where he remained for the next 20 years. Many of his most memorable stories came from his adventures he had as a patrolman. He retired at the rank of police captain around 1904 and, at the suggestion of friends and family, eventually entered the restaurant business.

He opened his first restaurant on Broadway which became an immediate success, despite his worries. His menu of chops, potatoes and ice cold beer attracted very large crowds and soon found his establishment too small to accommodate his customers. He sold his shop and bought a bigger place of Forty-Sixth Street, which seated 350 people, but this too proved too small and he eventually opened "Churchill's" in 1909. His establishment, built near his childhood home on Forty-Ninth Street, was built to seat 1,200 people and housed a French kitchen, top gourmet chefs and 300 employees. The restaurant-cabaret club quickly became not only famous in New York but also known throughout the country and internationally. It was a common occurrence that customers would have to wait in long lines simply to enter the restaurant. He later recalled that he spent $50,000 a year advertising a $250,000 business.

In the spring of 1921, shortly after the passage of the Volstead Act, Churchill sold his restaurant and sold the building to a syndicate of American and Chinese food dealers who opened a chop suey restaurant in its place. He was invited to Washington, D.C. and personally approached President Warren G. Harding to offer him the position of Prohibition Administrator for the state of New York. He declined the appointment and said to the president "Mr. Harding, I sold liquor for about fifteen years before prohibition went into effect. What would you think of a man who would turn tail on his friends who are now selling liquor and try to stamp them out ? I must refuse the appointment".

Churchill traveled abroad following the close of his restaurant. One notable journey he took was to the White House in 1923, where he reportedly served food to President Harding. On his return, he found that the city had changed during Prohibition. Among these, he commented on the subject on the employment of women in the restaurant industry "Hostesses ? There were no such things in my days. No one ever thought of such a thing. It was not permitted that any woman should come into a restaurant-cabaret unaccompanied. Instead of the hostesses, I employed thirty boys, one of them the late Rudolph Valentino, to dance with women who came unescorted for luncheon".

In January 1930, he and his family visited Atlantic City, New Jersey. While staying at the Hotel Traymore, he died from a severe attack of bronchial pneumonia on January 19, 1930. His wife Anna and his three daughters were with him at the time of his death and afterwards brought him back to New York for burial.
