= St. Charles College =

St. Charles College may refer to:

- St Charles Catholic Sixth Form College, in London, England
- St. Charles College (Louisiana), former Jesuit college in Grand Coteau, Louisiana, US
- St. Charles College (Maryland), former Catholic seminary school in Ellicott City, Maryland, US
- St. Charles College (Missouri), former Methodist college in St. Charles, Missouri, US
- St. Charles College, Onitsha, Nigeria
- St. Charles College, Pietermaritzburg, private boys' high school in KwaZulu-Natal province, South Africa
- St. Charles College (Sudbury), high school in Ontario, Canada
- St. Charles Community College, in St. Charles County, Missouri, US
