= Charles Churchill =

Charles Churchill may refer to:

- Charles Churchill (British Army officer, born 1656) (1656–1714), general and brother of John Churchill, 1st Duke of Marlborough
- Charles Churchill (British Army officer, born 1679) (1679–1745), lieutenant-general and son of the above, lover of Anne Oldfield and member of parliament
- Charles Churchill (of Chalfont) (1720–1812), colonel and son of the above by Anne Oldfield, member of parliament
- Charles Churchill (satirist) (1732–1764), poet and satirist, author of the Rosciad
- Charles Churchill (mutineer) (1759–1790), ship's corporal and mutineer on HMS Bounty
- Lord Charles Spencer-Churchill (1794–1840), soldier and member of parliament
- Charles Henry Churchill (1828–1877), British officer and diplomat
- Charles Churchill (1837–1916), founder of The Churchill Machine Tool Company
