= St. Charles Borromeo Church (Greece, New York) =

Coordinates: 43°13′28.52″N 77°38′34.56″W

- St. Charles Borromeo Church
- Location: Greece (town), New York
- Country: United States
- Denomination: Roman Catholic Church
- Tradition: Latin Rite

History
- Status: Parish
- Founded: 1926
- Founder(s): Bishop Thomas Francis Hickey George Pearson Leo Lawson

Architecture
- Functional status: Active

Administration
- Province: Ecclesiastical Province of New York
- Diocese: Roman Catholic Diocese of Rochester
- Parish: St. Charles Borromeo

Clergy
- Archbishop: Cardinal Timothy Dolan
- Bishop: Salvatore Matano (Apostolic Administrator)
- Vicar: Reverend Pius Pathmarajah
- Priest(s): Reverend John Firpo
- Pastor: Reverend John Firpo

St. Charles Borromeo Church is a Roman Catholic parish of the Latin Church. It serves the Barnard neighborhood of Greece, New York in Monroe County. It is on the corner of Dewey Avenue and Maiden Lane. It was founded in 1925 by Bishop Hickey on the request of Leo Lawson and George Pearson, and it included 72 families at its founding, and the first parish Mass was Sunday, November 6, 1925 . From 1926 until 2008, the Parish supported a parochial school

== Pastors ==
- Rev. John M. Sellinger (1925-1929)
- Rev. William A. Doran (1929-1939)
- Rev. Msg. Robert E. Keleher (1939-1968)
- Rev. John L. Hedges (1968-1978)
- Rev. Emmett J. Halloran (1978-1988)
  - Rev. Robert Collins, Administrator (1985-1986)
- Rev. Terrance Fleming (1988-1992)
- Rev. Edward Palumbos (1992-2001)
- Rev. Timothy Brown (2001-2008)
- Rev. John Firpo (2008- Incumbent)

== Current Clergy and Religious Laity ==
- Father John Firpo, Pastor (2008–Present) Former Parochial Vicar (1992-1996)
- Fr. Pius Pathmarajah, Parochial Vicar (2015–Present)
- Father Thomas Statt, Weekend Assistant (2000–2022)
- Deacon Dan Callan, Deacon (2012–Present)
