= Pierre-Alexis Delamair =

French architect

- Born: 1676; Paris
- Died: July 25, 1745 (aged 68–69); Agde
- Occupation: Architect
- Years active: 1695-1745
- Notable work: Hôtel de Rohan (Paris)

Pierre-Alexis Delamair (French pronunciation: [pjɛʁ aleksi dəlamɛːʁ]; 1675/6 in Châtenay-Malabry – 25 July 1745 in Agde) was a French architect, theorist and city planner, whose ambitious plan for a rational restructuring of the center of Paris, 1737, never came to fruition, as it would have required the demolition of the existing city to be replaced with an ideal city.

Delamair was the son of Antoine Delamaire, and received his training in the Bâtiments du Roi, directed by Robert de Cotte. His three works on architecture remained in manuscript. In one, Delamair proposed in 1725 enlarging and connecting as one, the three islands in the Seine, the Île de la Cité, the Île Saint-Louis, and the Île Louvier, to make a single Île de Paris that would make a more suitable site for the Hôtel de Ville. The idea was taken up by Pierre-Louis Moreau-Desproux in 1769 and expanded towards the end of the 18th century by Pierre Patte and by Charles De Wailly.

Delamair completed four hôtels particuliers, the Hôtel Chanac de Pompadour (1704–1710) in Paris for Abbé Pierre Hélie Chanac de Pompadour, the Hôtel de Soubise in Paris (1704–1709), for François de Rohan, prince de Soubise, and the adjoining Hôtel de Rohan (1704–1708), built for Soubise's son, Armand-Gaston, bishop of Strasbourg, and revisions to the former Palais Rohan in Strasbourg (1705–1708, demolished within Delamair's lifetime for the present structure). His replacement at the Rohan houses by Germain Boffrand, at the moment of his precocious triumph, left him an embittered man.

== Gallery ==
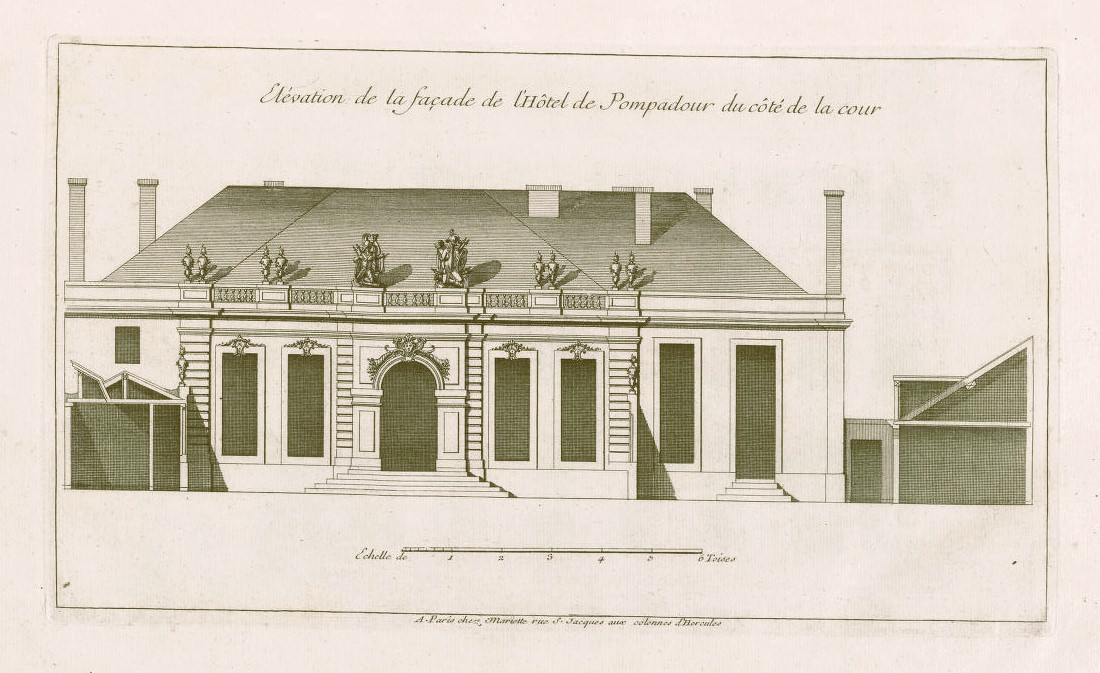
The historic façade of the Hôtel Chanac de Pompadour, Paris (1704)

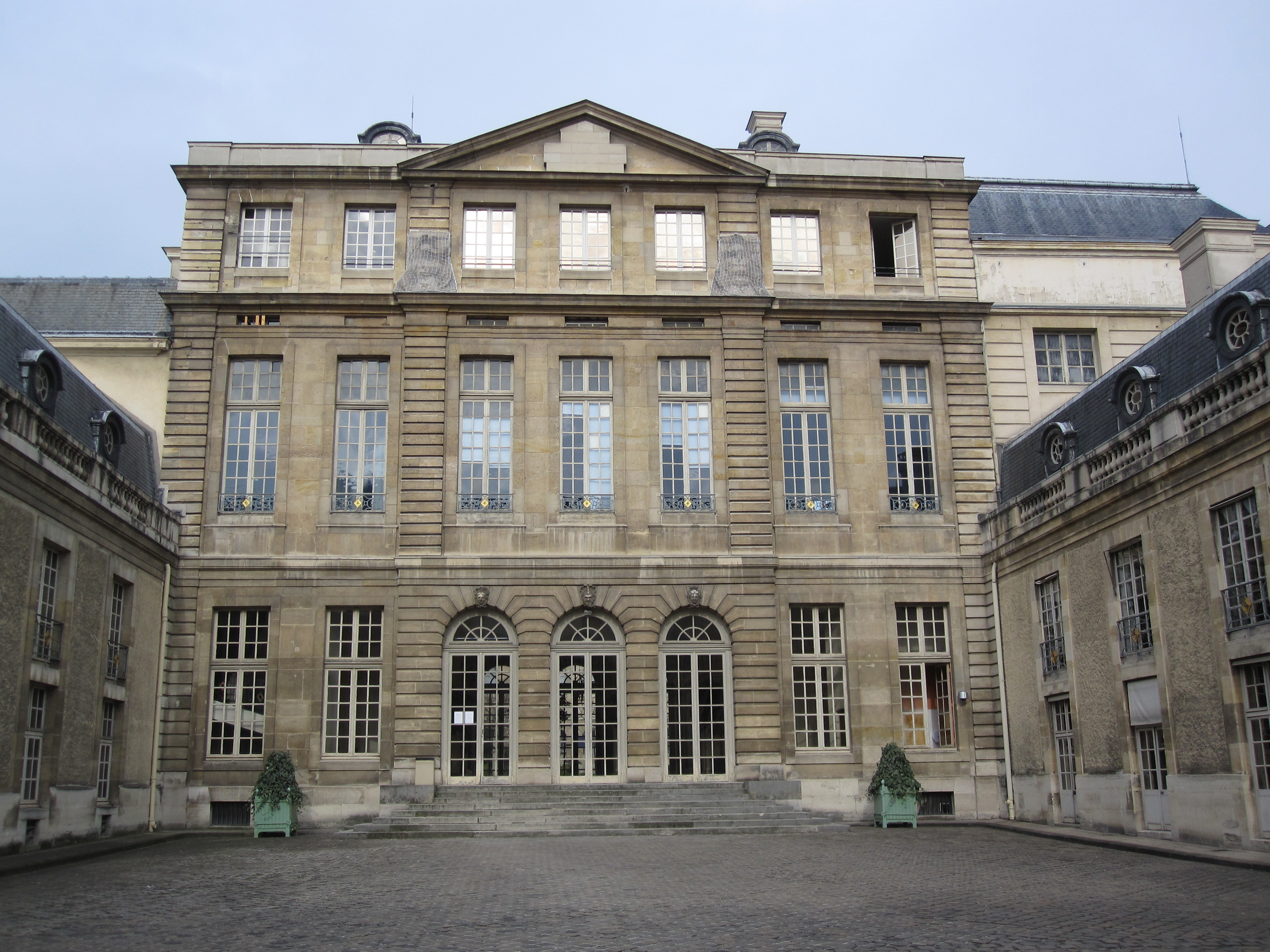
Hôtel de Rohan, Paris (1704)

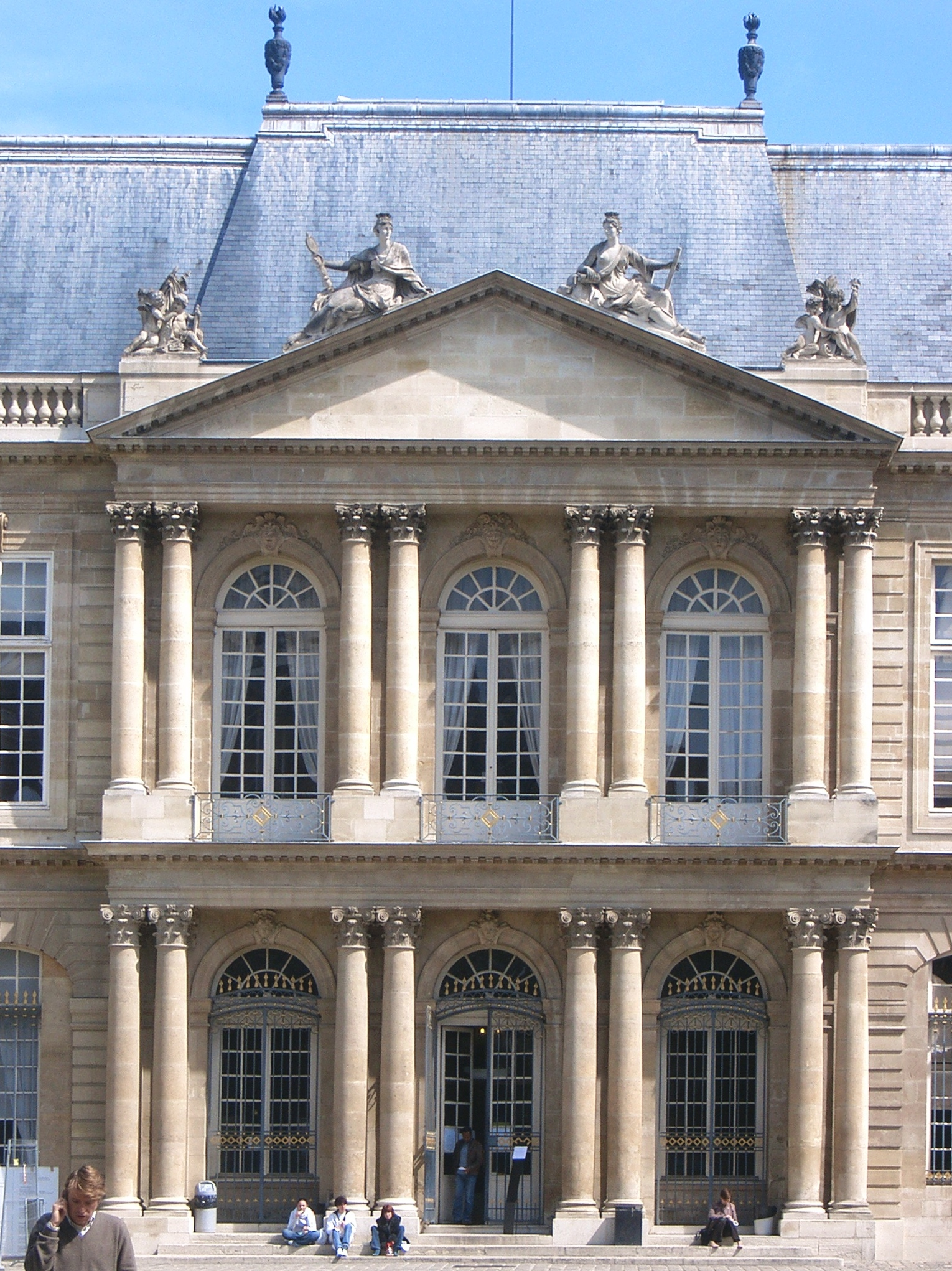
Hôtel de Soubise, Paris (1704)

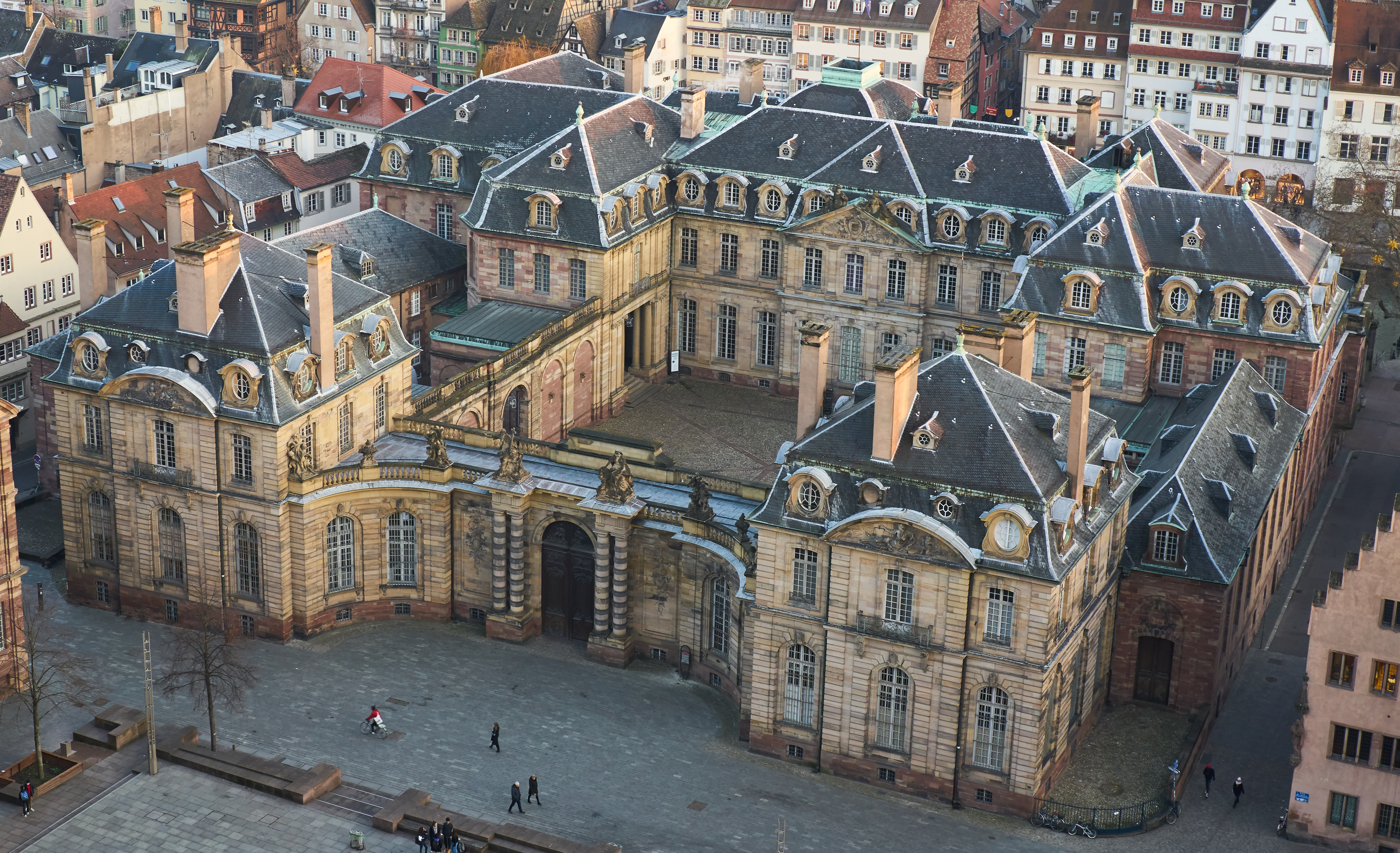
Palais Rohan, Strasbourg (revisions 1705–1708, later demolished)
