= Schloss Jägersburg =

Former palace in Germany

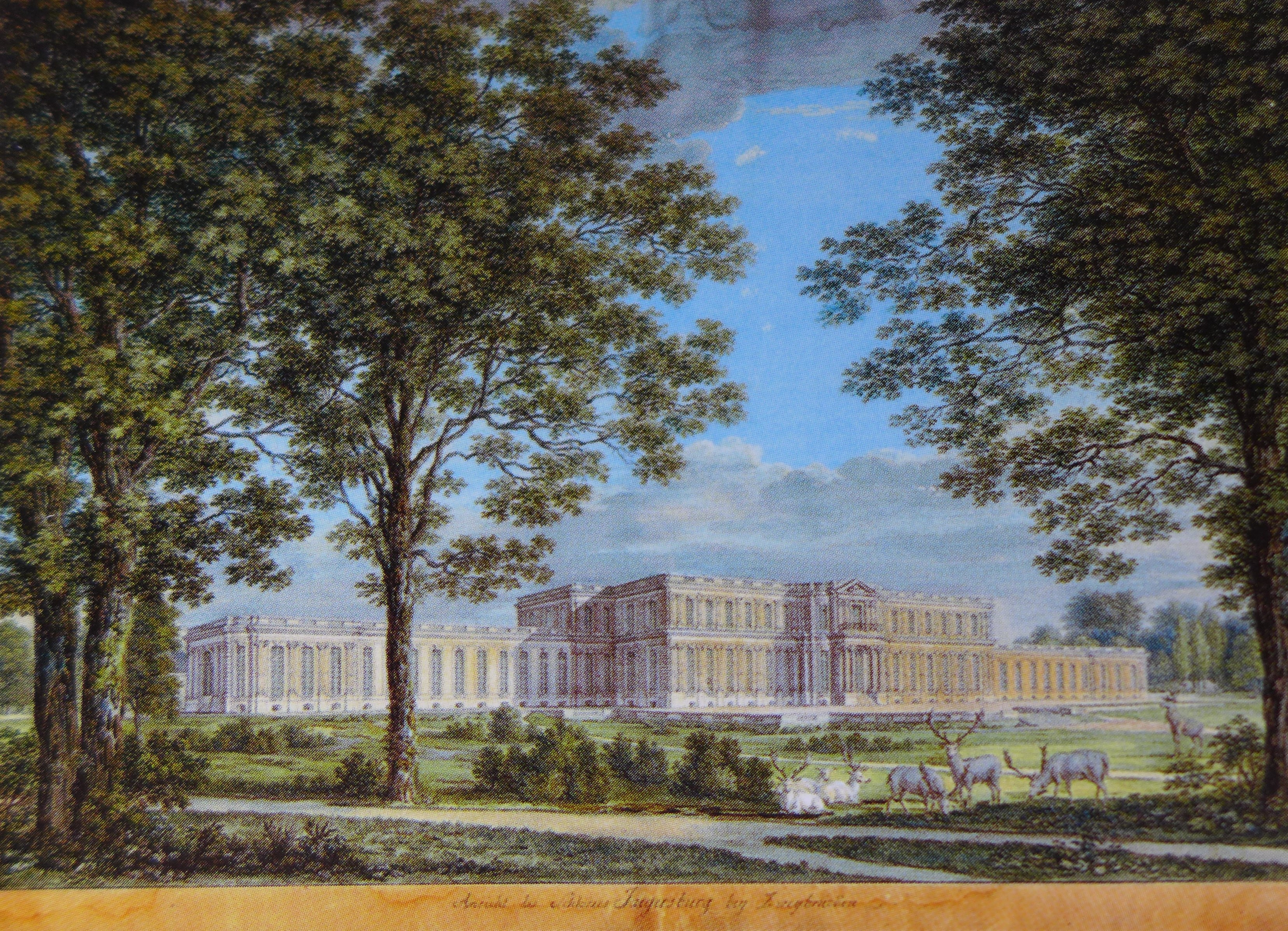
Schloss Jägersburg seen from the garden by Philipp Leclerc (1755-1826)

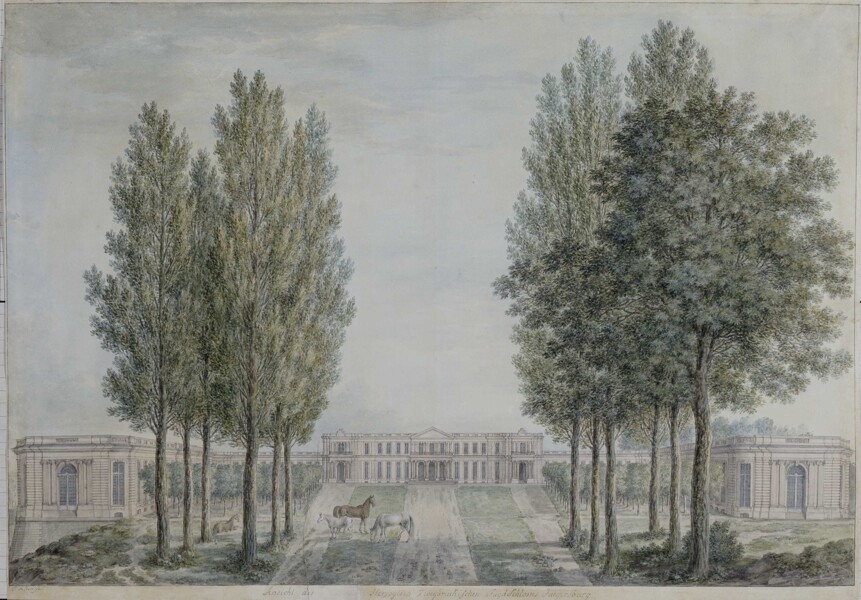
Schloss Jägersburg seen from the front by Philipp Leclerc (1755-1826)

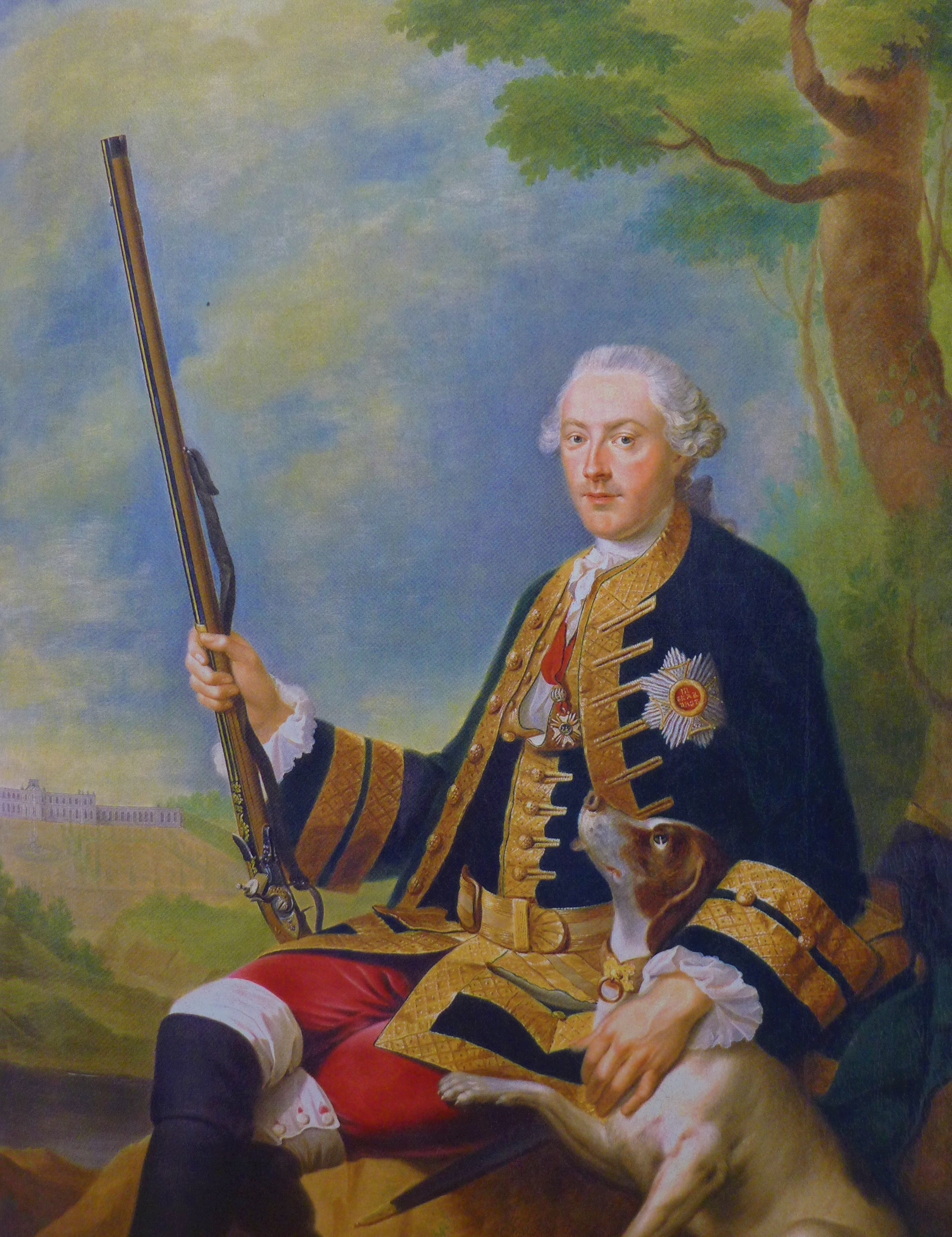
Duke Christian IV with Schloss Jägersburg in the background

Schloss Jägersburg (English: Jägersburg Palace) was a palace in Jägersburg, part of Homburg in the Saar-Palatinate (Saarpfalz) district, Germany. Constructed in the 18th century by French architect Jacques Hardouin-Mansart de Sagonne, it was one of the most important residences he ever built, and the favourite hunting lodge of Christian IV, Duke of Zweibrücken. Known as the German Grand Trianon, it was destroyed during the French Revolutionary Wars and its last remains were demolished at the start of the 19th century. Today, nothing remains of one of the first neoclassical palaces in Germany.

== History ==
Already in the 16th century, the dukes of Zweibrücken were hunting in the area of Jägersburg. The centre of the hunt was a medieval castle, which is currently named ‘Gustavsburg.’ In 1750, the French king Louis XV (1710-1774) received duke Christian IV of Zweibrücken (1722-1775) in his Palace of Versailles. During his visit, Christian developed a long-lasting friendship with the king, as well as with Madame de Pompadour (1721-1764) . The duke was granted an apartment in the palace of Versailles. In addition, the duke had his own Hôtel in Paris . Christian IV had great admiration for the French royal palaces. Stimulated by these palaces, he decided to construct his own palace and hunting palace in Jägersburg. He engages the French architect Jacques Hardouin-Mansart de Sagonne (1711-1778) to make a design using the Grand Trianon as example, one of the architectural masterpiece of Jules Hardouin-Mansart, Mansart de Sagonne's grand father. Construction started in 1752 and was ended in 1756 by Pierre Patte, successor of Mansart de Sagonne. The interiors will take to 1770 to complete. However, as from 1755/ 1756 onwards, the palace can already be used for its purposes, such as ‘’par force hunts’’. In 1756, Hardouin-Mansart was replaced by the architect Pierre Patte. Johann Ludwig Petri designed the landscape gardens around Schloss Jägersburg. The palace became the preferred seat of the duke.

Christian IV’s successor, duke Charles II August (1746-1795) lived in the palace during the first years of his reign. But in 1779, he moves to Schloss Karlsberg and Jägersburg palace is no longer used. In 1782, there were plans to reconstruct the place on the Karlsberg. However, these plans were scrapped due to its high costs. The furniture of Schloss Jägersburg was nevertheless moved to Schloss Karlsberg, and the castle was empty. During the French Revolutionary wars, the palace was set on fire various times by revolutionary troops as well as local farmers. Ruins remained and were still standing around 1802, when colonel Thomas Thornton visited them. Colonel Thornton even considered purchasing nearby Schloss Jägersberg. The Jägersburg ruins were demolished somewhere in the years to follow after his visit.

Today nothing remains from the palace, except various engravings and watercolours, such as those made by Philipp LeClerc, the court painter of Charles II August. The museum in the Gustavsburg castle has a model of Schloss Jägersburg.

== Architecture ==
The palace was one of the first neoclassical palaces in Germany. Its design was based on the Grand Trianon near the Palace of Versailles. But, it was also inspired by the Château de Clagny. The Jägersburg palace was around 123 metres width.

Schloss Jägersburg bears similarities to Château d'Asnières, which was also designed by Jacques Hardouin-Mansart de Sagonne.

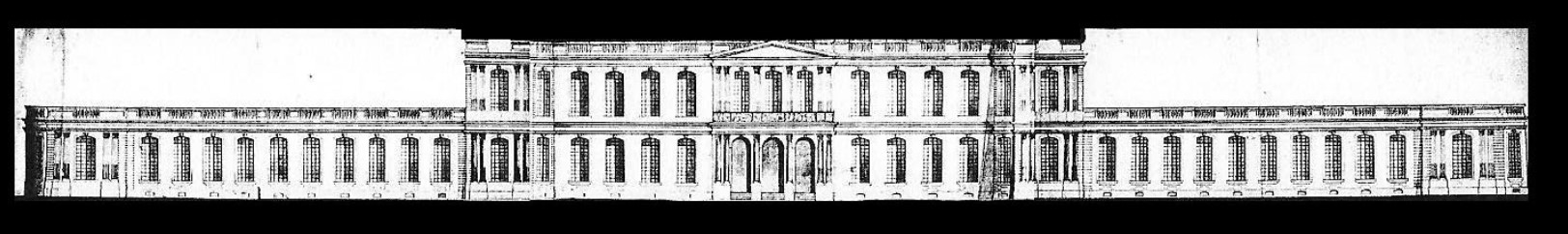
Front of Schloss Jägersburg

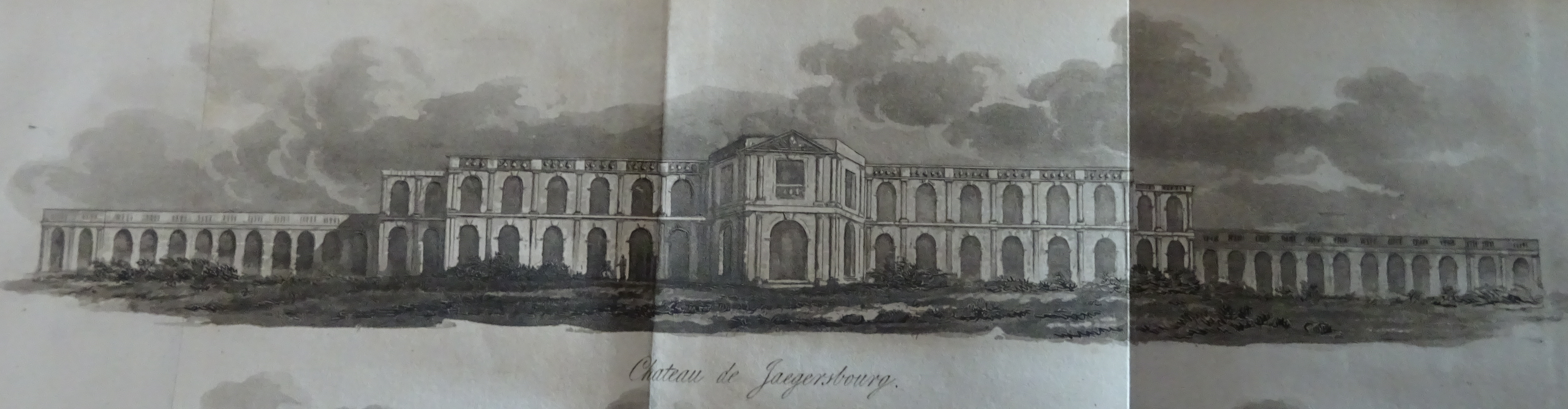
Schloss Jägersburg in ruins in 1802

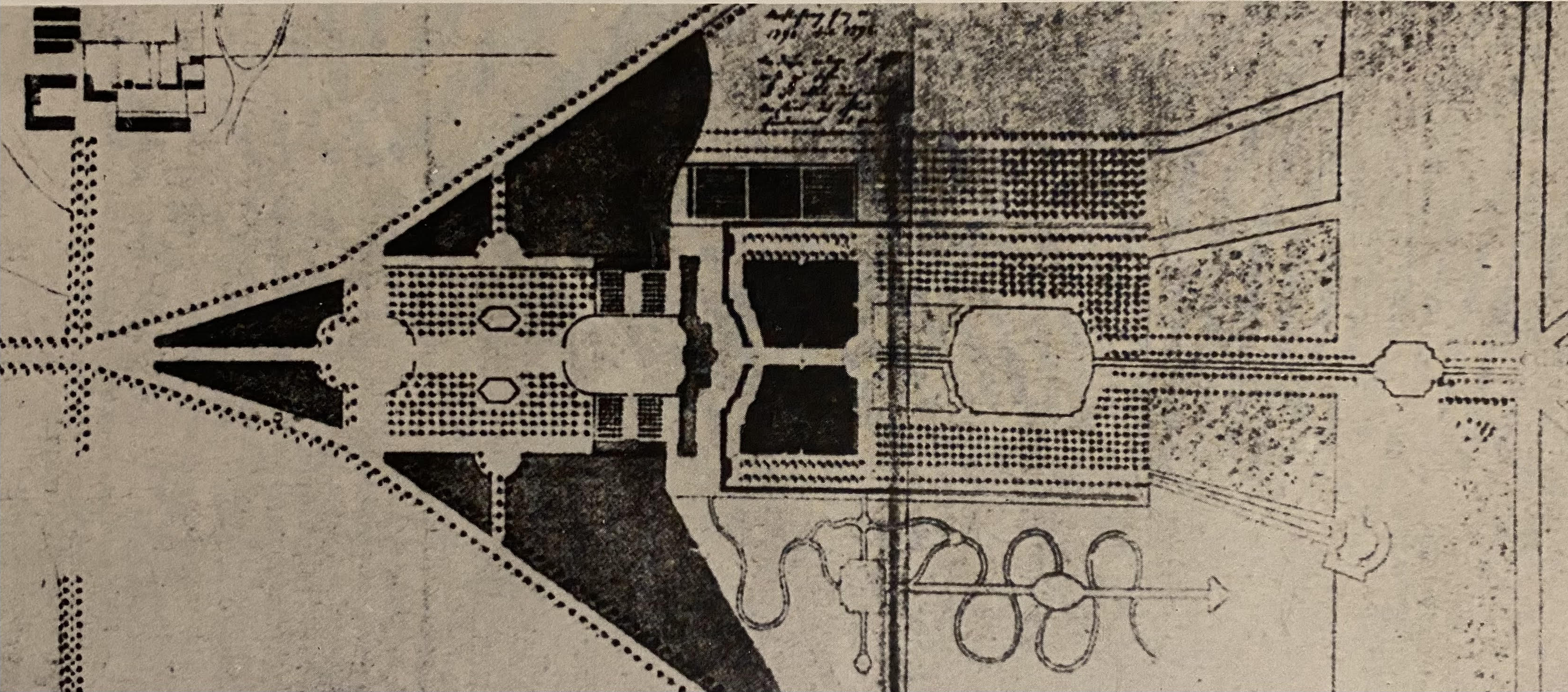
1755 Plan of the gardens around Schloss Jägersburg by Johann Ludwig Petri (destroyed in the Second World War)

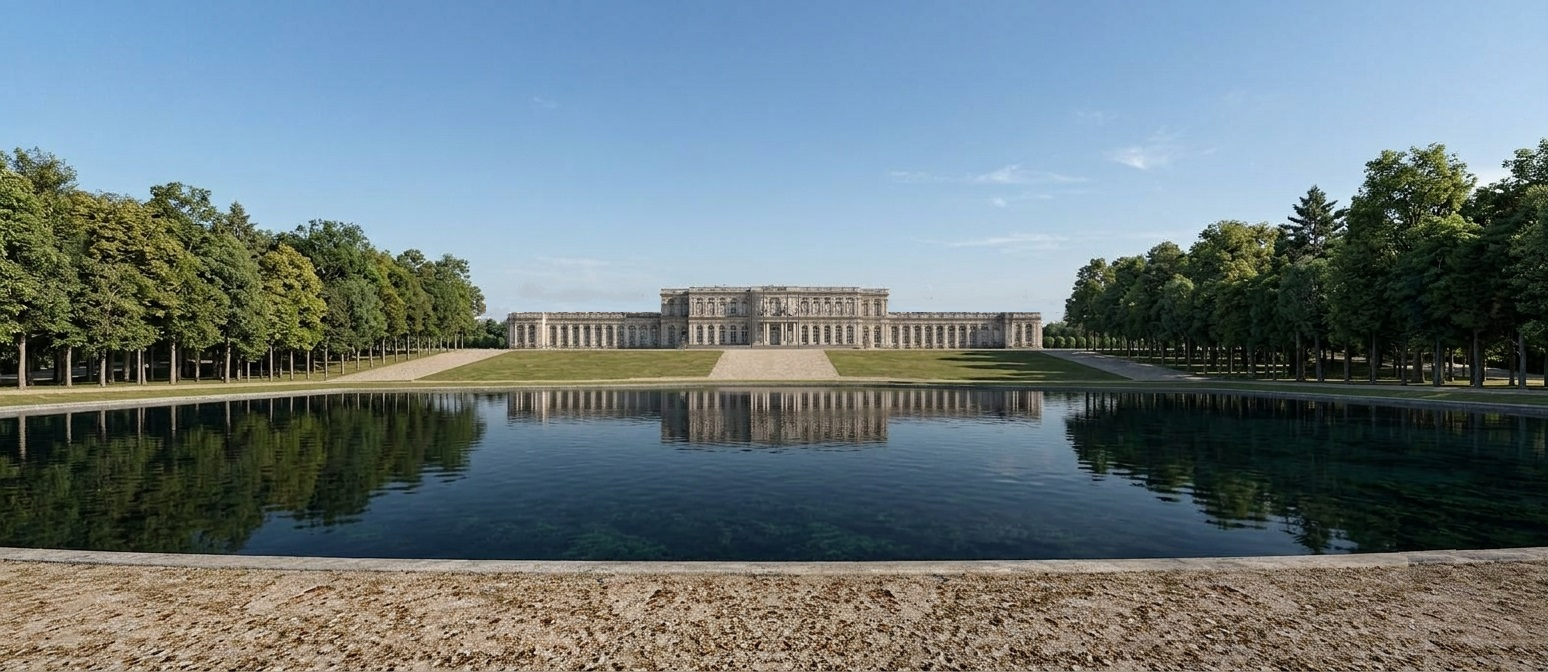
Restitution de la vue depuis le bout du jardin du château de Jagersburg, XVIIIe siècle

== Literature ==
- Weber, Wilhelm (1987). Schloss Karlsberg : Legende und Wirklichkeit : die Wittelsbacher Schlossbauten im Herzogtum Pfalz-Zweibrücken (in German). Homburg (Pfalz): Ermer Verlag. pp. 77–91. ISBN 978-3924653026.
- Schneider, Ralf (1988). Burgen und Schlösser an der Saar (in German). Saarbrücken: Joachim Conrad and Stefan Flesch. p. 449. ISBN 3-477-00078-1.
- Schneider, Ralf (2003). Schlösser und Landsitze der Herzöge von Pfalz-Zweibrücken in den Oberämtern Zweibrücken und Homburg im 18. Jahrhundert Architektur – Intérieur – Gartenkunst (in German). Heimsheim. pp. 97–128. ISBN 3-477-00078-1.
- Cachau, Philippe (2012). "Le château de Christian IV, duc des Deux-Ponts, à Jägersburg. Un château français en Allemagne (1752-1756)" (PDF). Francia (in French). 39. Institut historique allemande de Paris: 135–165.
- Cachau, Philippe (2018). "Zwei französische Architekten im Dienste Christian IV., Herzog von Zweibrücken: Jacques Hardouin-Mansart de Sagonne und Pierre Patte" (PDF). Saarpfalz Blätter für Geschichte und Volkskund (in German): 37–51.
- Glück, Charlotte, ed. (2022). Dazwischen 300 Jahre Herzog Christian IV von Pfalz-Zweibrücken (in German). Zweibrücken: Stadtmuseum Zweibrücken. pp. 88–89. ISBN 978-3-9814791-5-7.
