= Château d'Asnières =

Castle in Asnières-sur-Seine, France

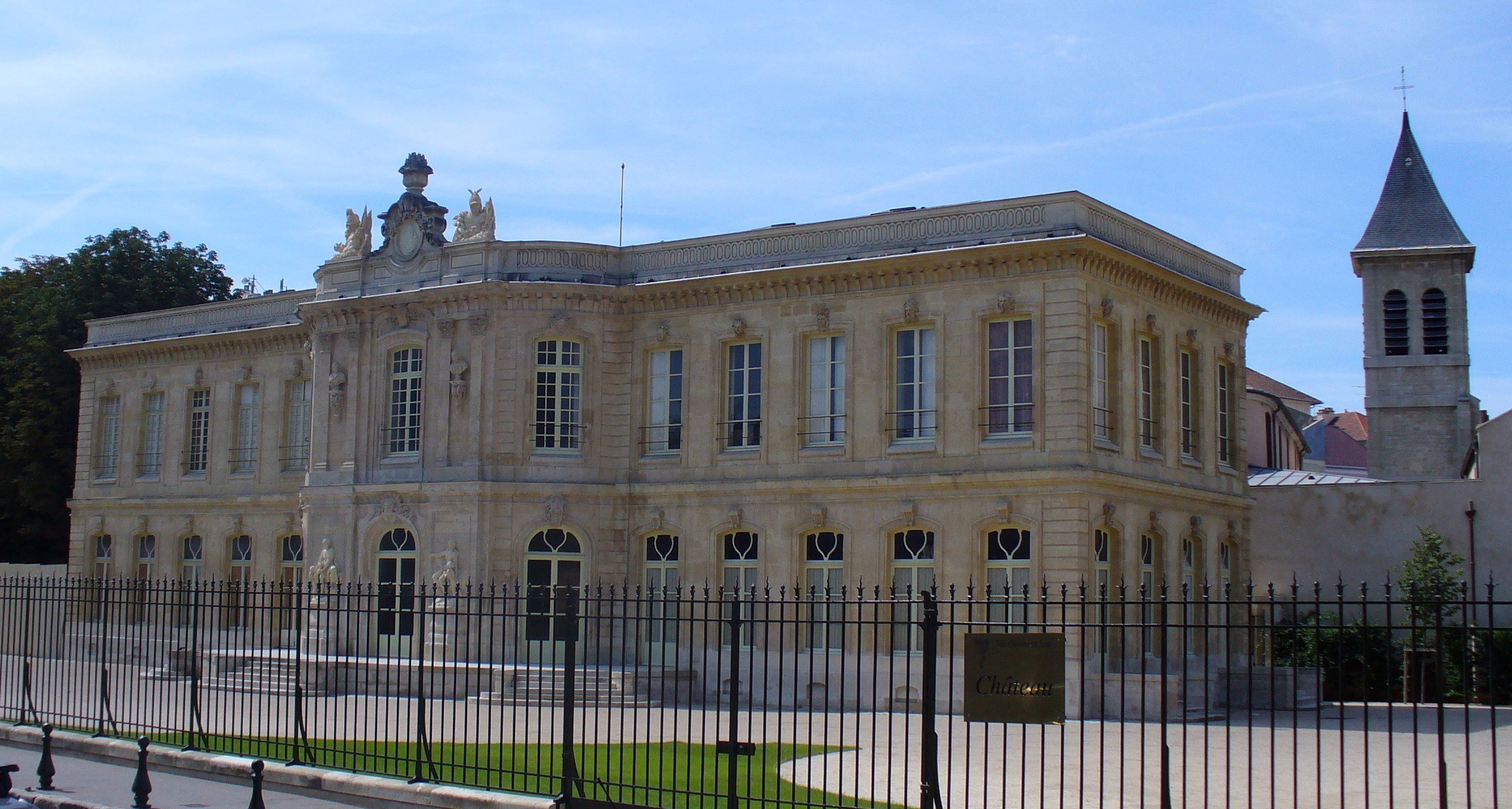
The Château d'Asnières

The Château d'Asnières (French pronunciation: [ʃɑto dɑnjɛʁ]) is a stately home at 89 Rue du Château in the Parisian suburb of Asnières-sur-Seine in Hauts-de-Seine, France.

== History ==
=== Construction ===
With adjoining stables at the edge of its grounds (capable of housing 120 horses and known as the "entrepôt général" or central depot for the Asnières stud), the château was one of the finest estates near Paris in the mid 18th century. It shows the artistic ambitions of Marc-René d'Argenson, marquis de Voyer, who gathered the best artists and craftsmen of his time to work on the building—the architect Jacques Hardouin-Mansart de Sagonne, the craftsman Nicolas Pineau, the sculptor Guillaume Coustou the Younger, the painters Brunetti and Jean-Baptiste Marie Pierre, and the bronze worker Jacques Caffieri. Its gallery contained one of the best collections of Flemish and Dutch art of the period along with some of the largest cabinet furniture. D'Argenson wished to replace the marquis de Marigny, directeur des Bâtiments, Arts et Manufactures du Roi, brother of Madame de Pompadour, and to rival the sumptuous residences built by the duc de Richelieu at Gennevilliers, the duc de Choiseul at Clichy, by his family's enemy Madame de Pompadour at Bellevue and even by his own father at Neuilly.

He bought the château in January 1750 from Amy Pictet, a Paris banker, procurer for Isaac Thélusson, Genevan ambassador and a famous Swiss banker. The price was 60,000 livres for the building and 15,000 for the furniture. Little by little it became the central point in a vast estate. Until 1756, that estate would be formed by forcing the inhabitants of the village into long leases. The marquis' house was built on the site of a late 17th-century house built by Antoine Lemoyne, priest-doctor at the Sorbonne, which during the Regency had belonged to the famous comtesse de Parabère, the regent's mistress, who was often visited there by him.

The marquis also acquired part of the village church to become his chapel. He became director of the king's stud in 1752 and thus needed new lands to build a centre for reorganising it—these were built to designs by Mansart de Sagonne between 1752 and 1755 as a large stone-vaulted building where horses could be dressed before being sent back to the other royal studs. Their site was to the right of the present-day bridge in Asnières. They were linked to the château by a vast avenue flanked on both sides by triple rows of trees—de Sagonne had exploited a motif employed by his great-great-great-uncle François Mansart at Maisons-Laffitte. Beside the château, this avenue culminated in a forecourt leading to the main courtyard. At the back was a wing of the château destroyed in the 19th century. Behind that wing was a pavilion surrounded by a small theatre, now also demolished. During works late antique burials were discovered. Behind this wing was a rear courtyard opening onto the village square.

The centre of the wings was marked by a forecourt with semi-circular lawns and topped by a bust of the king with the marquis' monogram on the base to remind the viewer of his royal post. Some courtiers thus mocked the château d'Asnières, calling it a new royal residence built in the marquis' name. Raised on two levels and topped by a covered way in the Italian style with railings, the château has a z-shaped floor plan, evoking the Grand Trianon by de Sagonne's grandfather Hardouin-Mansart.

Asnières also included the first work by Charles de Wailly, designer of the Odéon in Paris—on his return from Italy, the marquis de Voyer entrusted him with updating the rococo dining room designed by Pineau. De Wailly added marble pilasters and a classical cornice, decorated with a mosaic frieze of putti. De Wailly also worked on the marquis' hôtel in Paris in the 1760s.

The château d'Asnières's notoriety increased during the 18th century thanks to the presence of the collector and engraver Claude-Henri Watelet then the famous Genevan banker Thélusson, future client of Claude Nicolas Ledoux. It was finally given up by the marquis in 1769 and passed through various hands. Its stud was taken back into direct royal control in 1764, remaining in service until the royal studs were dissolved during the French Revolution. The stable buildings were demolished between 1812 and 1835.

=== Later life ===
In the mid 19th century it was the setting for soirées and balls for the Parisian middle classes, mentioned by (among others) Offenbach in a first act rondo in La Vie parisienne: "Qu'on me mène au bal d'Asnières!" ("That takes me to the ball at Asnières!"). On 25 August 1850 a great international festival was put on there, gathering the best French and Belgian amateur choirs of the time and totalling 2000 singers and 25,000 spectators. Offenbach referenced this in the seventh scene in Geneviève de Brabant (1867), which takes place in the imaginary "château d’Asnières, home of Charles Martel" and includes the phrase "Amis, faisons vibrer sous ces dômes brillants / Nos chœurs les plus bruyants !" ("Friends, under these shining domes / Let's make our loudest choirs ring!"). In 1897 some of its rococo panelling was sold off and reused for the French Dining Room at Cliveden in the United Kingdom.

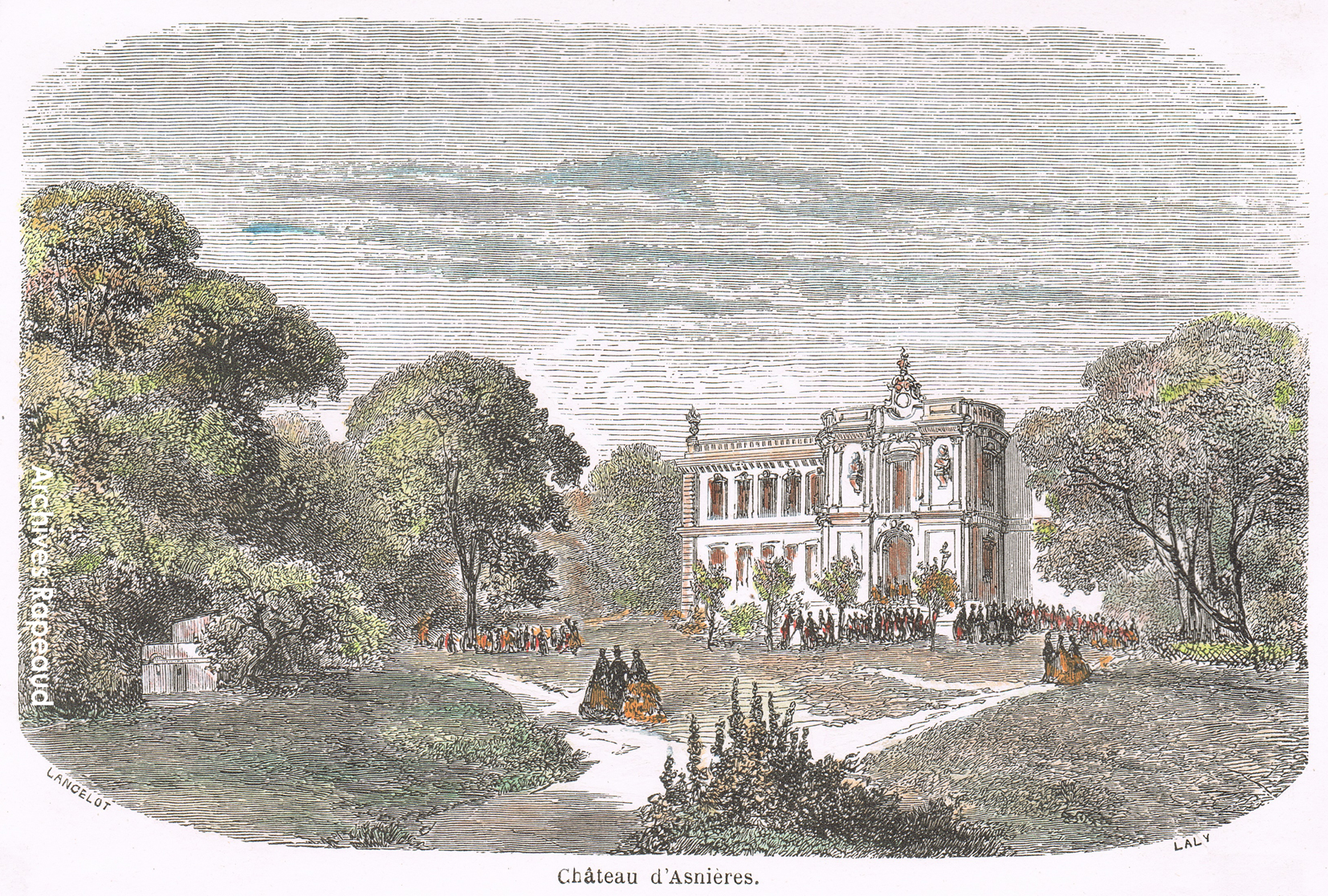
Engraving of around 1860 showing the château d'Asnières

The building was then taken on by various religious institutions, the latest being the Institution Sainte-Agnès, which left it in 1976. A society of friends, the Association des Amis du Château et du Vieil Asnières, was set up in 1978, but the building lay empty and vandalism and bad weather left it dangerously unsafe until it was acquired by the town council in 1991 and restoration was commenced in 1996. Its garden was made a historic monument on 9 June 1971, as was the château on 18 July 1996. The restoration was completed with the reopening of the first floor on 12 September 2014.

== Gallery ==
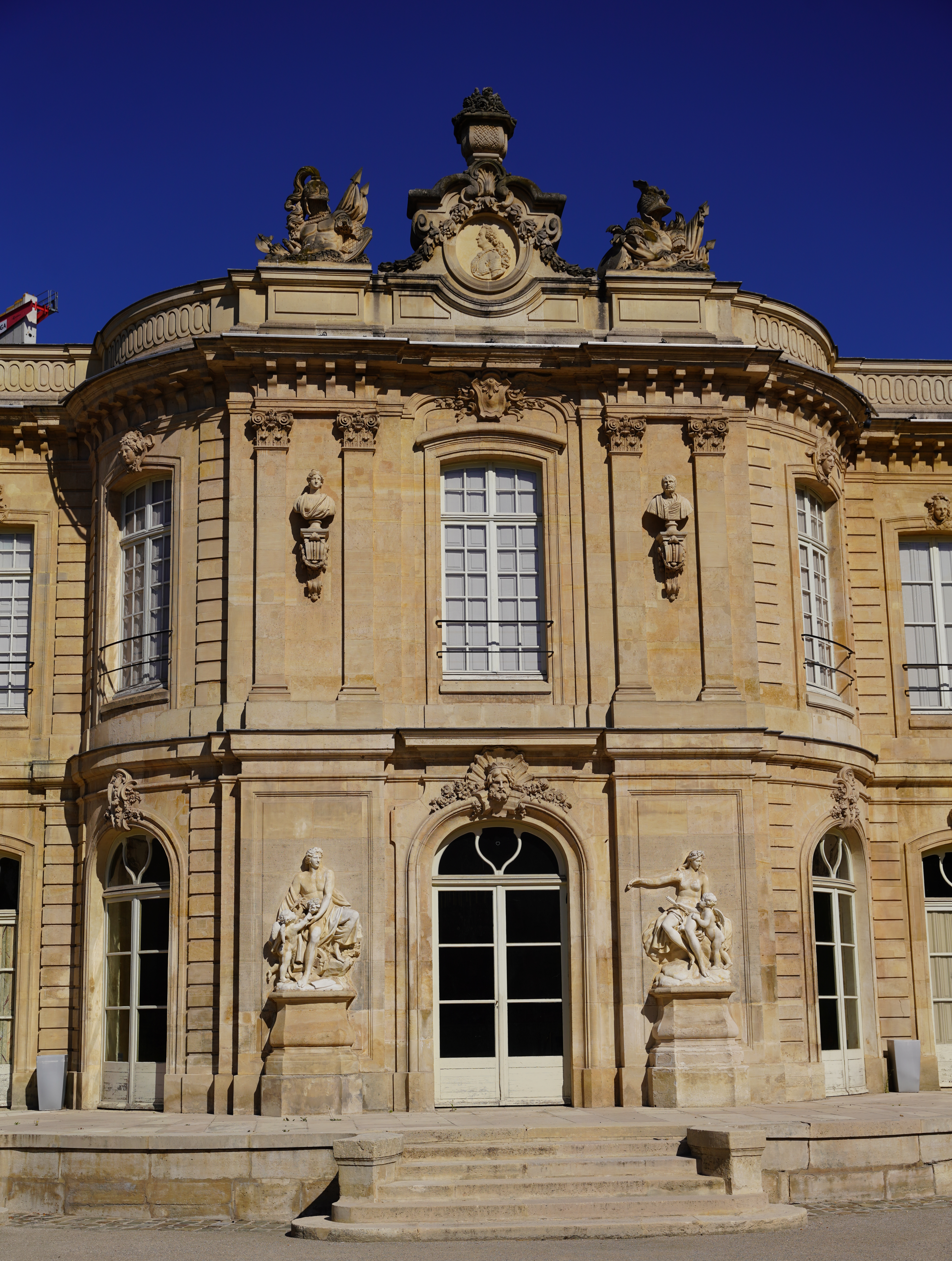

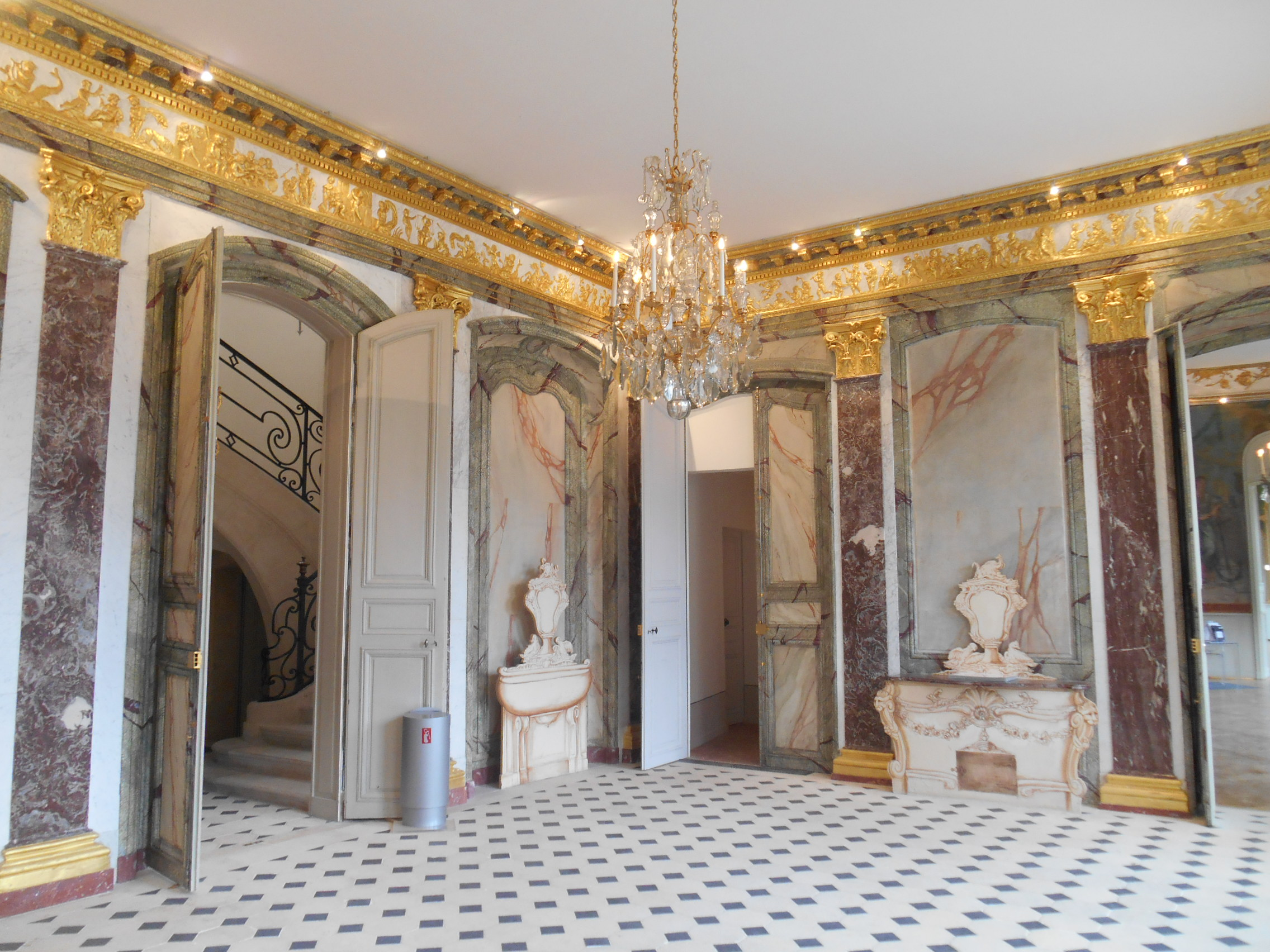

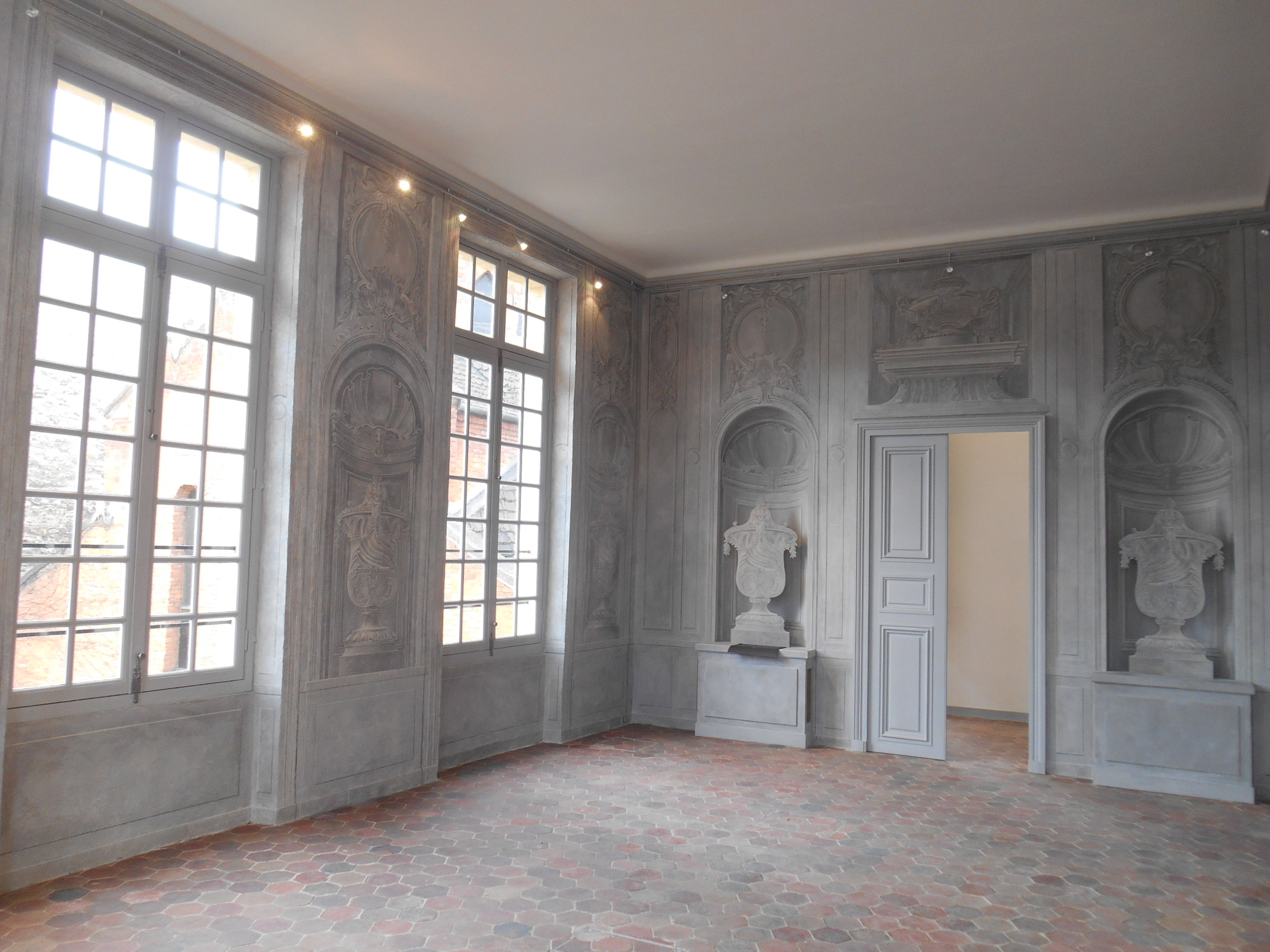

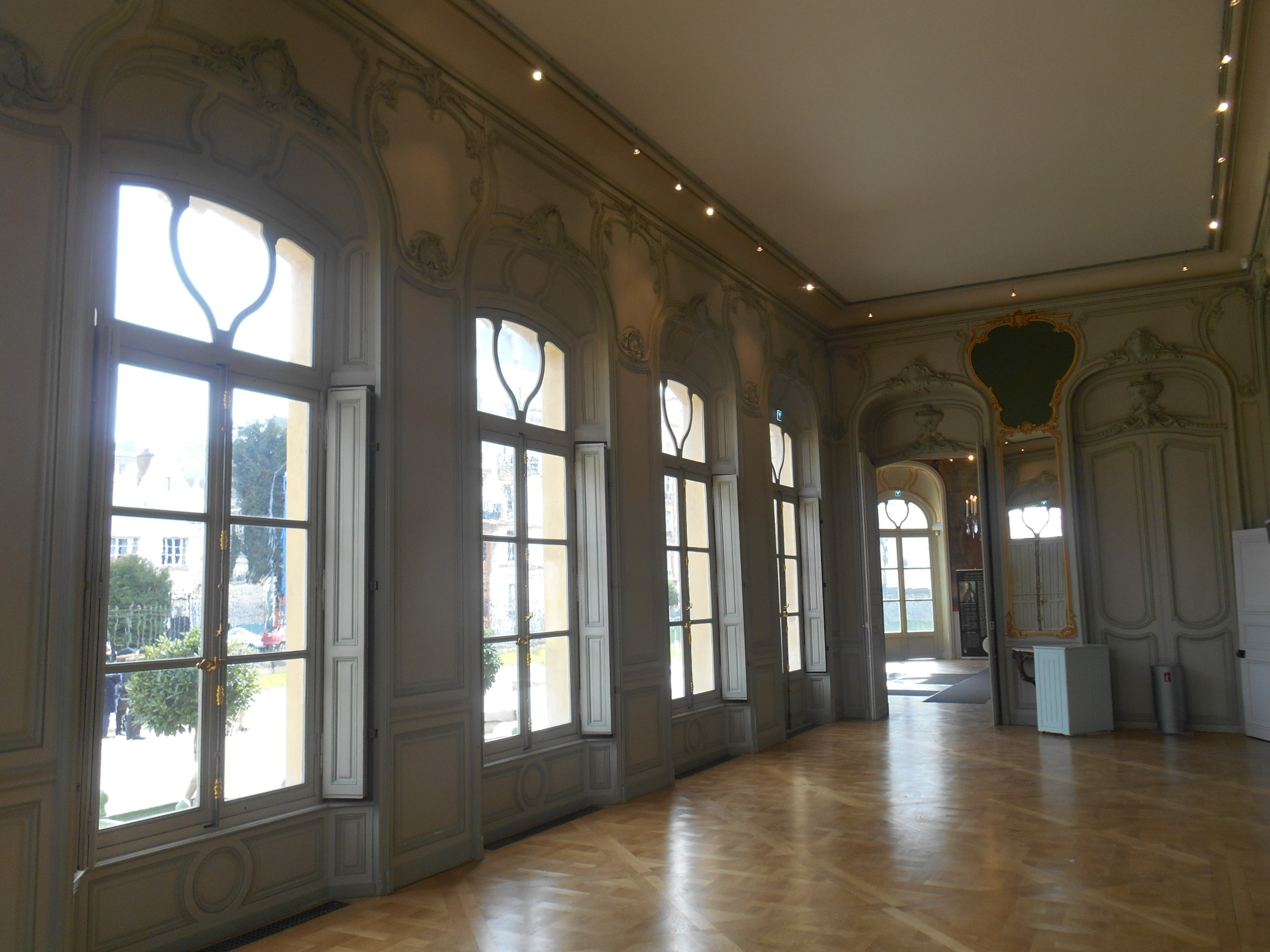

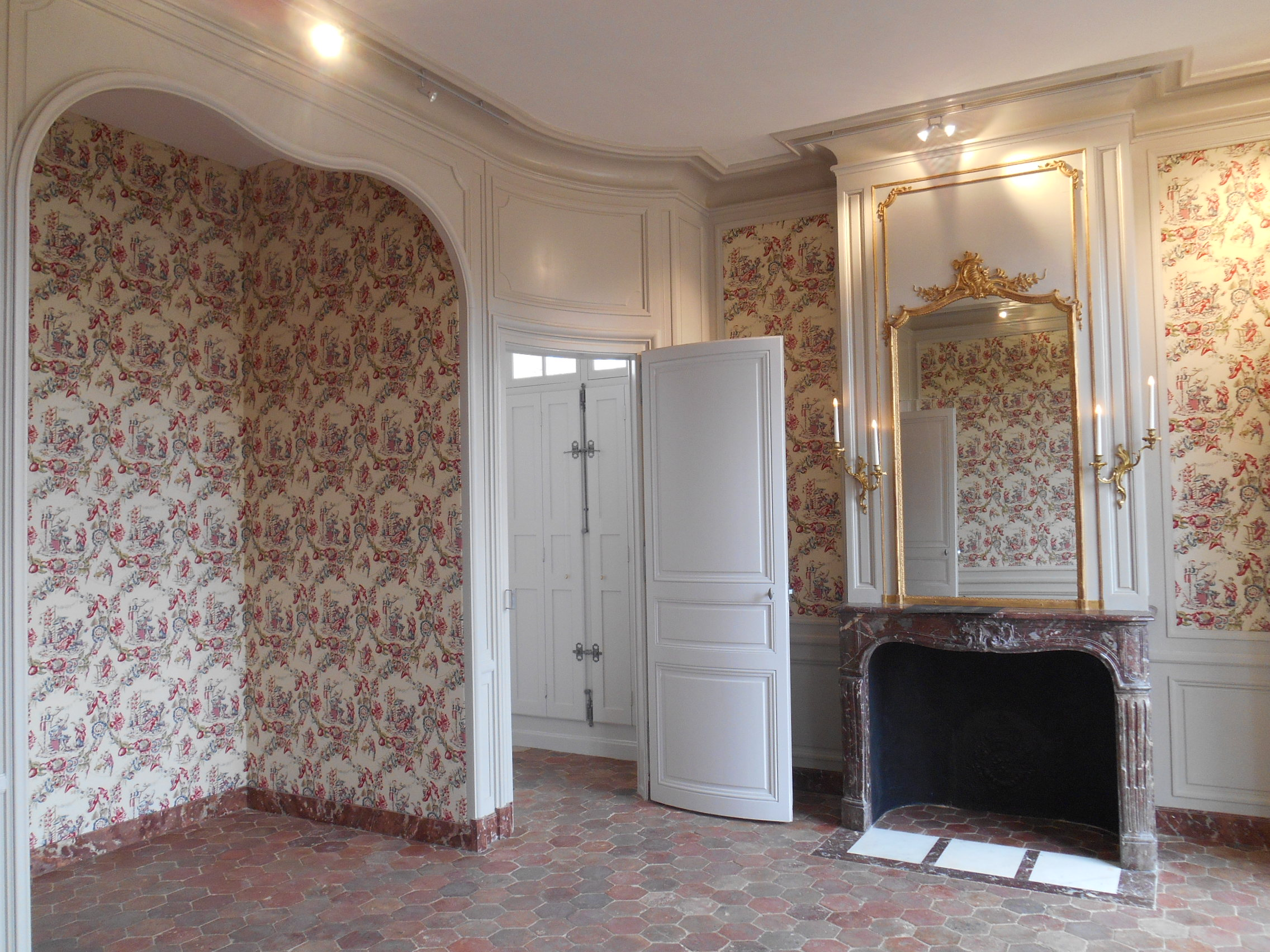

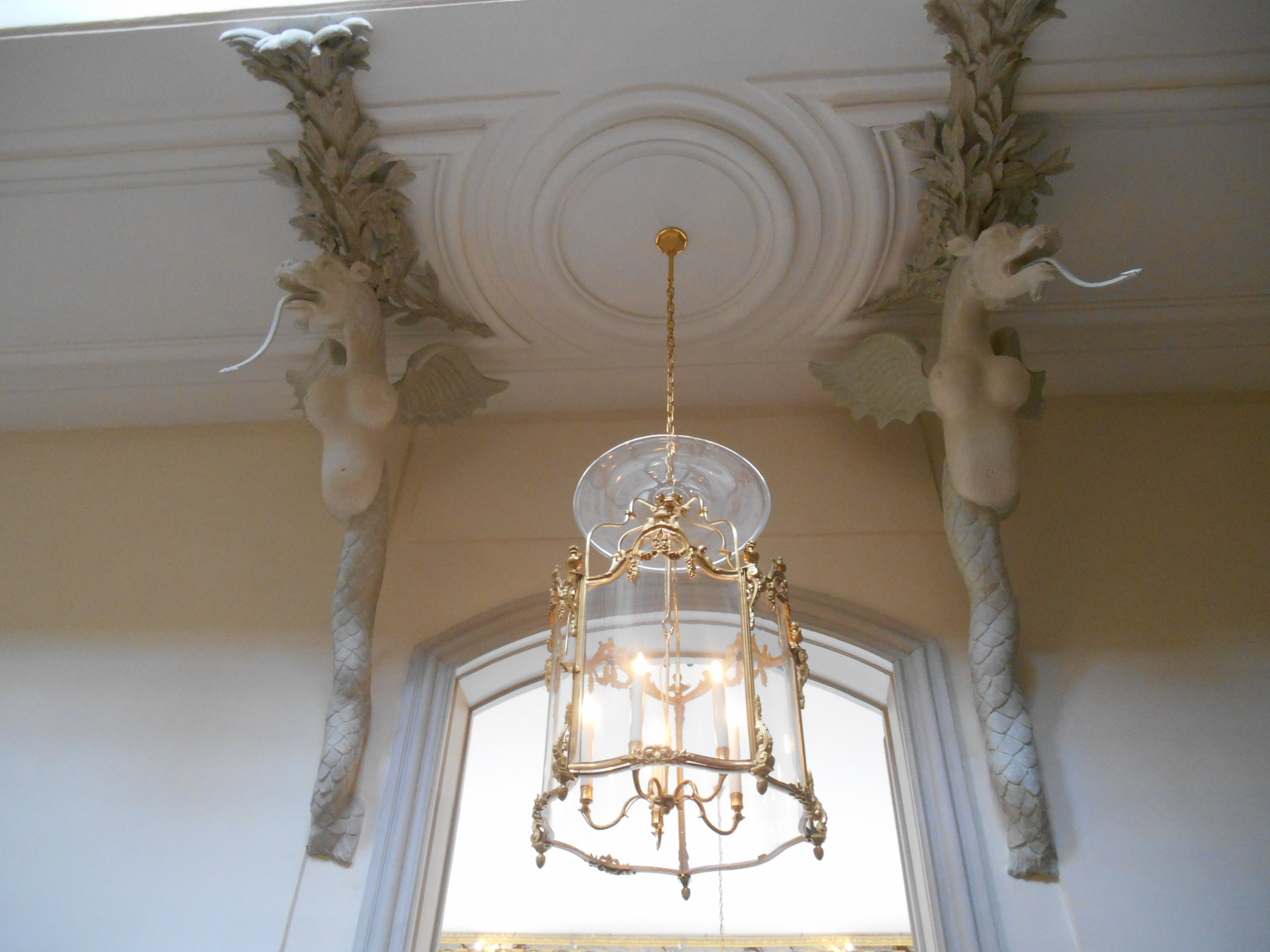

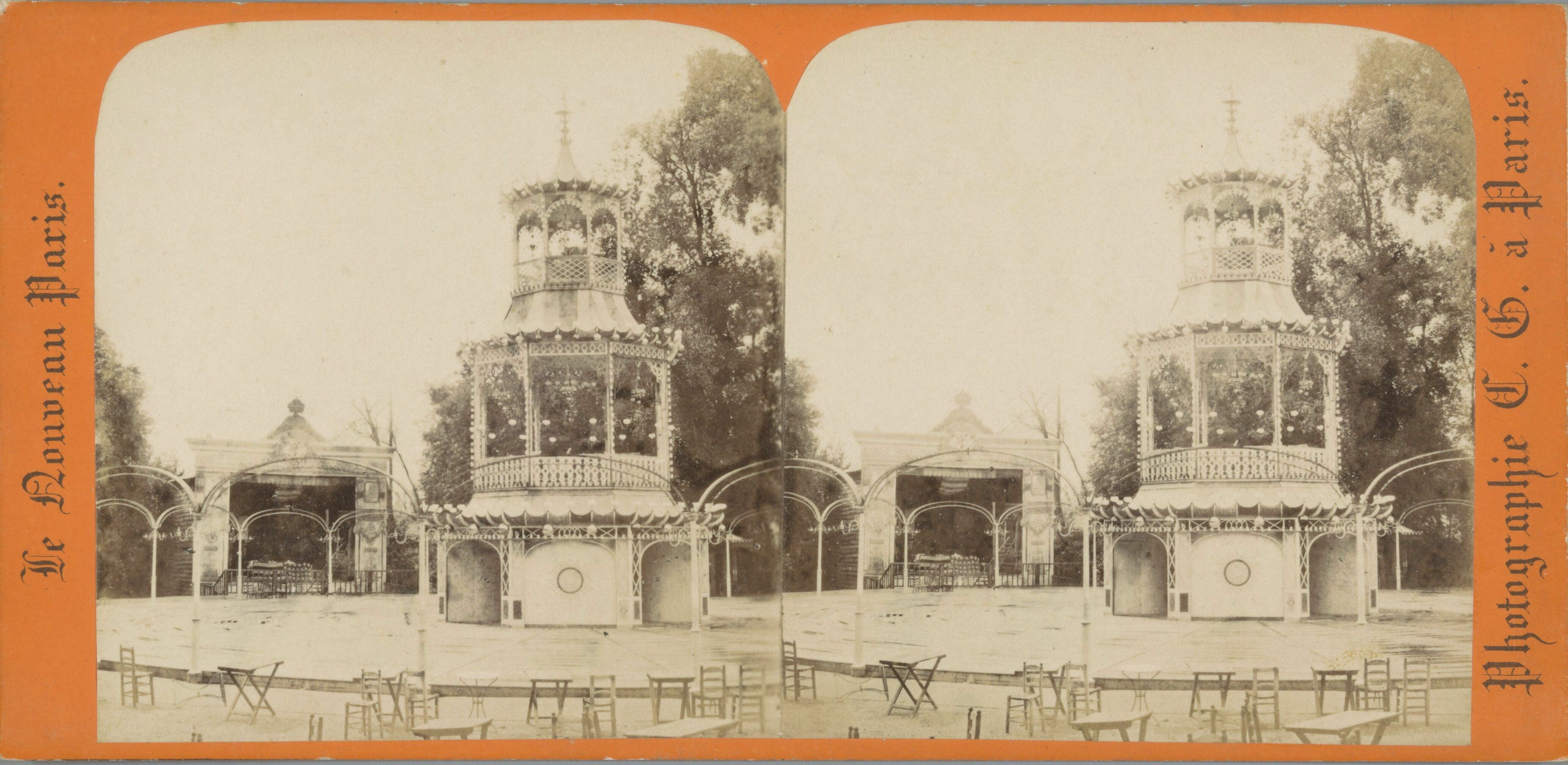

== Influences ==
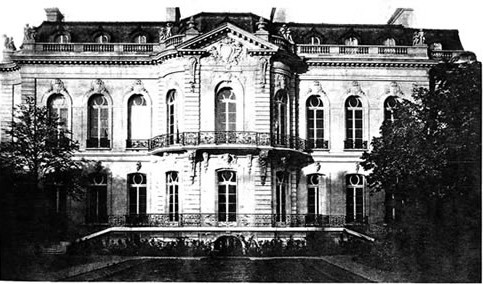
Hôtel Porgès - garden façade. Ernest Sanson, architecte.

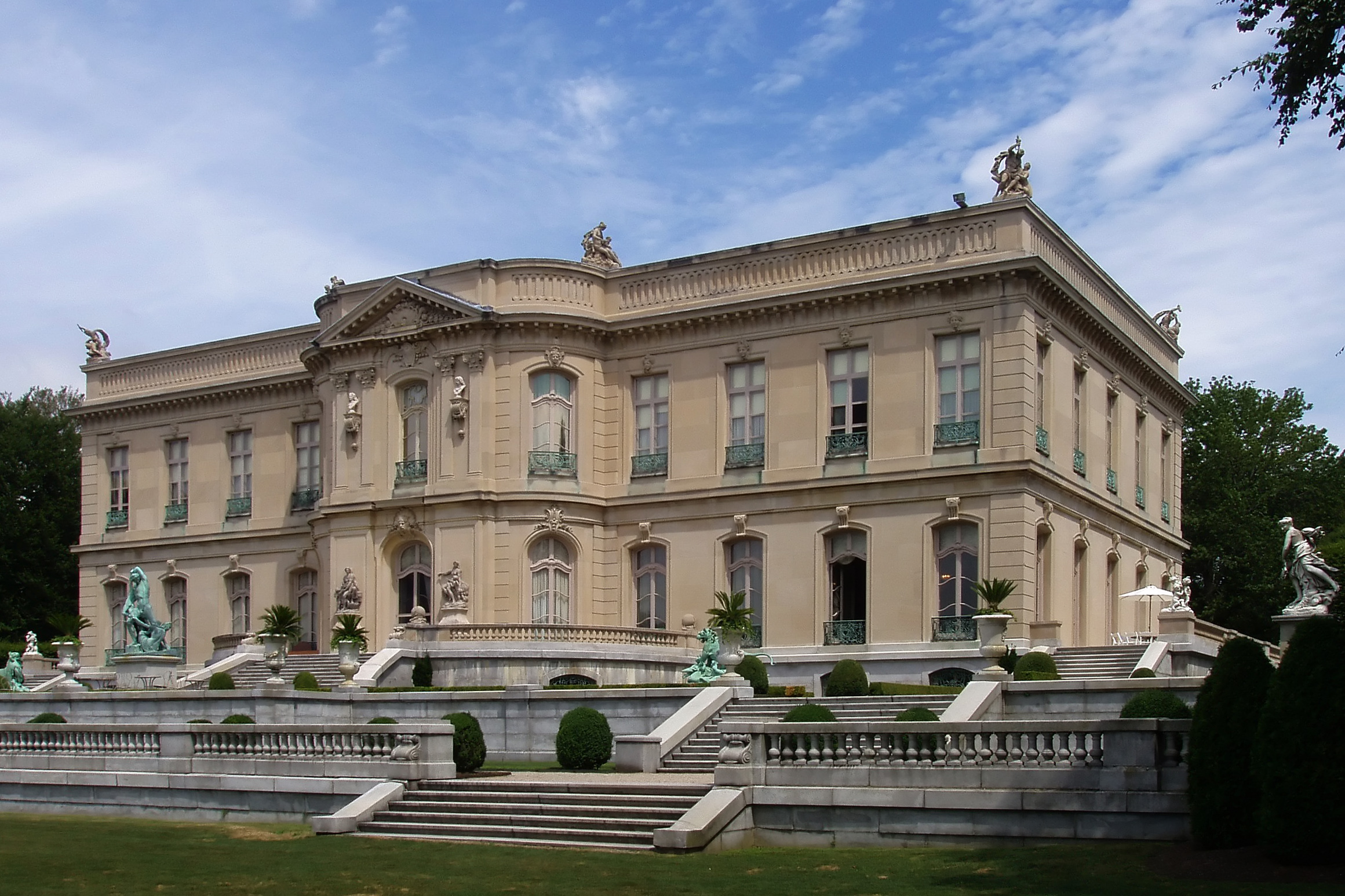
The Elms at Newport (Rhode Island). Horace Trumbauer, architect.

Several architects have built houses that are considered to be reinterpretations of the château d'Asnières, including Hôtel Porgès, 18 avenue Montaigne in Paris, built in 1892 for Jules Porgès by the architect Ernest Sanson (demolished); and The Elms, built in 1901 for the coal magnate Edward Julius Berwind by the architect Horace Trumbauer, with interior decoration installed by Jules Allard and Sons.

Nevertheless, there are significant differences: whereas the flanking sections of Château d'Asnières are five bays wide, those at Sansons's house are three bays wide, and those at Trumbauer's house are four bays wide. Furthermore, the pediment on the garden facade of Trumbauer's house is a variation of Sanson's. There is no pediment at Château d'Asnières.

There are also similarities between the château d'Asnières and the château de l'Engarran in Hérault, built in the 18th century. And further, with Schloss Jägersburg, which was also designed by Jacques Hardouin-Mansart de Sagonne.

== Bibliography ==
- Philippe Cachau : "Jacques Hardouin-Mansart de Sagonne, dernier des Mansart (1711-1778)", doctoral thesis in art history at Paris-I, 2004, volume II, p. 1161-1177
- Nicole de Blomac : "Le cheval, moyen et mode de vie. L'œuvre du marquis de Voyer, militaire, philosophe et entrepreneur (1722–1782)", history thesis at the École Pratique des Hautes Études en Sciences Sociales, April 2002, supervised by Daniel Roche (2 volumes).
