= Jacques Hardouin-Mansart de Sagonne =

Jacques Hardouin-Mansart de Sagonne (26 July 1711, Paris - 27 September 1778, Paris) was a French architect. He was the illegitimate son of Jacques Hardouin-Mansart, comte de Sagonne, by his mistress Madeleine Duguesny - Jacques and Madeleine married in 1726. Jacques junior's elder brother was the architect Jean Mansart de Jouy (1705-1783), whilst he was also the grandson of Jules Hardouin-Mansart, great-great-great nephew of François Mansart and great-nephew of Robert de Cotte.

== Works ==
- Château d'Asnières
- Schloss Jägersburg
