= Jean Mansart de Jouy =

French architect

Jean Mansart de Jouy (1705, Paris – 1783) was a French architect. He was also known as Mansart the Elder (Mansart l'Aîné).

He and his younger brother, Jacques Hardouin-Mansart de Sagonne, were both bastard sons of Jacques Hardouin-Mansart by his mistress Madeleine Duguesny, later his wife but at the time married to Jean Maury. Their grandfather was Jules Hardouin-Mansart, Louis XIV's chief architect.

De Jouy is most notable for his rebuilding of the entrance to the église Saint-Eustache in Paris, which was finally completed in 1788 by Pierre Louis Moreau.

== Bibliography ==
- Bruno Pons, « Le grand salon du château d'Abondant », Revue du Louvre, 1991.
