= Jacques Hardouin-Mansart =

Jacques Hardouin-Mansart, comte de Sagonne (21 October 1677, Paris – 1762) was a French politician and soldier. He was the second son and fifth and final child of the architect Jules Hardouin-Mansart (1646–1708) and Anne Bodin (1646–1738).

On 15 January 1701 he married Madeleine Bernard (1684–1716), daughter of the most powerful banker in Europe, Samuel Bernard. His contemporaries saw this marriage as one of the most prestigious of the time. The king and several members of the royal family signed the wedding contract. However, the marriage proved an unhappy one and in 1702 he took Guillemette Duguesny (later known as Madeleine) as his mistress - he had five children with her, but only two survived, the architects Jean Mansart de Jouy and Jacques Hardouin-Mansart de Sagonne. Duguesny was then married to Jean Maury, a food clerk in Toulouse. In 1709 Samuel Bernard demanded that Hardouin-Mansart and his daughter separate, with their lands separated too - this was passed in December 1709 and she died of smallpox in November 1716 without issue. Duguesny used her two sons by Hardouin-Mansart to make a claim on his fortune right up until her death in 1753, which were opposed by his widowed mother Anne Bodin, the financier Claude Lebas de Montargis (husband of his sister Catherine-Henriette Hardouin-Mansart), then finally by Anne-Charlotte, marquise d'Arpajon, daughter of Claude and Catherine-Henriette. The couple married in 1726, though this did not legitimate their two sons.

== Sources ==
- http://geographieculturelle.doomby.com/pages/geographie-culturelle-de-la-france/la-descendance-de-jules-hardouin-mansart/partie-1.html
