= Pierre Patte =

French architect (1723–1814)

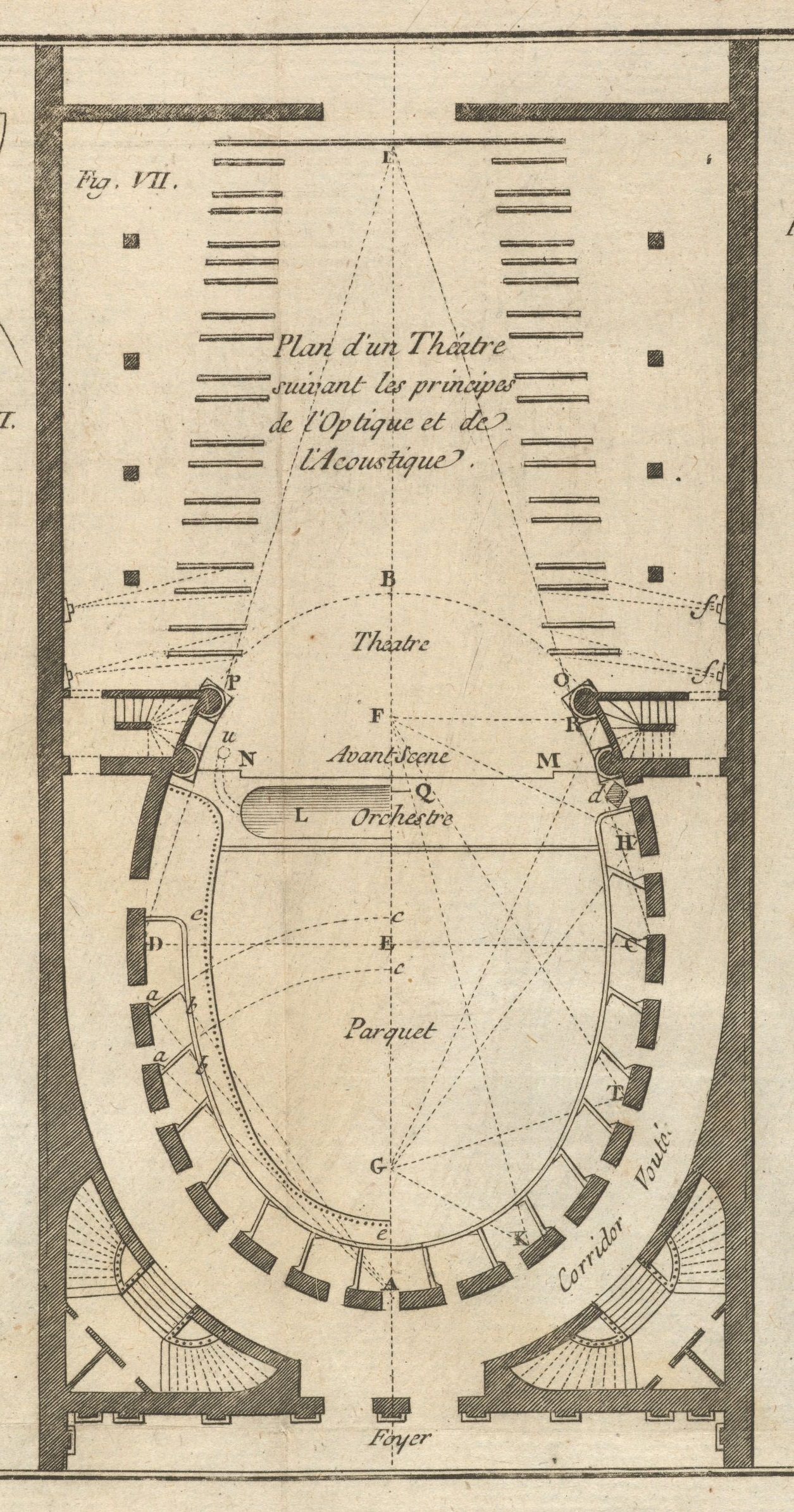
"Plan d'un Théatre suivant les Principes" by Patte, 1782

Pierre Patte (1723–1814) was a French architect who was the assistant of the great French teacher of architecture, Jacques-François Blondel, whose Cours d'architecture which ran to nine volumes by 1777, he saw through the press after Blondel's death in 1774.

He has been credited for having been the first to illustrate a city street plan with buildings and sewer system shown in a section view, a reference to a section he produced in 1769, though recent study has shown the irrefutable influence of a similar drawing produced by the Portuguese engineer Eugenio dos Santos in the aftermath of the 1755 Lisbon earthquake. Under the reign of Louis XV, Patte theorized in the middle of the 18th century about thinking about the overall structure of the city as an urban organism where changing one aspect would affect the whole thing. A century later some of Patte's ideas would help change Paris under the direction of Baron Haussmann.

He was involved in the design and completion of Schloss Jägersburg.

== Selected works ==
- Discours sur l'Architecture (Discourse on Architecture) (1754)
- Études d'Architecture (Studies of Architecture) (1755)
- Monuments érigés en France à la Gloire de Louis XV (Monuments Erected in France to the Glory of Louis XV) (1765)
- Cours d'architecture (1771–1777)
- Essai sur l'Architecture Théâtrale (Essay on Theatre Architecture) (1782)

== Bibliography ==
- "Patte, Pierre" A Dictionary of Architecture and Landscape Architecture. James Stevens Curl. Oxford University Press 2006. Retrieved via Oxford Reference Online, 18 February 2007
- "The Portuguese Precedent to Pierre Patte's Street Section". Andrew Tallon. Journal of the Society of Architectural Historians 2004.
