= List of Philippine provinces and regions by highest point =

This is a list of Island groups, regions and provinces of the Philippines by their highest point.

== Island group ==
Rank	Island group	Highest Point	Highest elevation
1	Mindanao	Mount Apo	2,954 m 9,692 ft
2	Luzon	Mount Pulag	2,922 m 9,587 ft
3	Visayas	Mount Kanlaon	2,465 m 8,087 ft

== Regions ==
Rank	Region	Highest Point	Highest elevation
1	XI-Davao Region	Mount Apo	2,954 m 9,692 ft
1	XII-SOCCSKSARGEN	Mount Apo	2,954 m 9,692 ft
2	X-Northern Mindanao	Mount Dulang-dulang	2,941 m 9,649 ft
3	II-Cagayan Valley	Mount Pulag	2,922 m 9,587 ft
3	Cordillera Administrative Region	Mount Pulag	2,922 m 9,587 ft
4	Bangsamoro Autonomous Region in Muslim Mindanao	Mount Ragang	2,815 m 9,236 ft
5	IV-B-Mimaropa	Mount Halcon	2,586 m 8,484 ft
6	NIR-Negros Island Region	Mount Kanlaon	2,465 m 8,087 ft
7	V-Bicol Region	Mayon Volcano	2,463 m 8,081 ft
8	I-Ilocandia	Mount Sicapoo	2,360 m 7,740 ft
9	IV-A-Calabarzon	Mount Banahaw	2,177 m 7,142 ft
10	VI-Western Visayas	Mount Madja-as	2,117 m 6,946 ft
11	III-Central Luzon	Mount Tapulao	2,037 m 6,683 ft
12	XIII-Caraga	Mount Hilong-hilong	2,012 m 6,601 ft
13	IX-Zamboanga Peninsula	Mount Pinukis	1,532 m 5,026 ft
14	VIII-Eastern Visayas	Alto Peak (Mount Aminduen)	1,325 m 4,347 ft
15	VII-Central Visayas	Osmeña Peak	1,015 m 3,330 ft
16	Metro Manila	Unnamed Peak	240 m 787 ft

== Provinces ==
Rank	Province	Highest Point	Highest elevation	Island
1	Davao del Sur	Mount Apo	2,954 m 9,692 ft	Mindanao
1	Cotabato	Mount Apo	2,954 m 9,692 ft	Mindanao
2	Bukidnon	Mount Dulang-dulang	2,938 m 9,639 ft	Mindanao
3	Ifugao	Mount Pulag	2,922 m 9,587 ft	Luzon
3	Benguet	Mount Pulag	2,922 m 9,587 ft	Luzon
3	Nueva Vizcaya	Mount Pulag	2,922 m 9,587 ft	Luzon
4	Lanao del Sur	Mount Ragang	2,815 m 9,236 ft	Mindanao
5	Mountain Province	Mount Amuyao	2,701 m 8,862 ft	Luzon
6	Davao de Oro	Mount Tagubud	2,670 m 8,760 ft	Mindanao
7	Kalinga	Mount Alchanon	2,617 m 8,586 ft	Luzon
8	Oriental Mindoro	Mount Halcon	2,582 m 8,471 ft	Mindoro
9	Misamis Oriental	Mount Balatukan	2,560 m 8,400 ft	Mindanao
10	Occidental Mindoro	Mount Baco	2,489 m 8,166 ft	Mindoro
11	Negros Occidental	Mount Kanlaon	2,465 m 8,087 ft	Negros
11	Negros Oriental	Mount Kanlaon	2,465 m 8,087 ft	Negros
12	Albay	Mayon Volcano	2,463 m 8,081 ft	Luzon
13	Abra	Mount Balbalasang	2,454 m 8,051 ft	Luzon
14	Misamis Occidental	Mount Malindang	2,404 m 7,887 ft	Mindanao
15	Ilocos Norte	Mount Sicapoo	2,360 m 7,740 ft	Luzon
16	South Cotabato	Mount Matutum	2,286 m 7,500 ft	Mindanao
17	Ilocos Sur	Mount Camingingel	2,283 m 7,490 ft	Luzon
18	Laguna	Mount Banahaw	2,177 m 7,142 ft	Luzon
18	Quezon	Mount Banahaw	2,177 m 7,142 ft	Luzon
19	Antique	Mount Madja-as	2,117 m 6,946 ft	Panay
19	Aklan	Mount Madja-as	2,117 m 6,946 ft	Panay
20	Palawan	Mount Mantalingajan	2,085 m 6,841 ft	Palawan
21	Capiz	Mount Nangtud	2,074 m 6,804 ft	Panay
22	Romblon	Mount Guiting-guiting	2,058 m 6,752 ft	Sibuyan
23	Zambales	Mount Tapulao	2,037 m 6,683 ft	Luzon
24	Sarangani	Mount Busa	2,030 m 6,660 ft	Mindanao
25	Camarines Sur	Mount Isarog	2,011 m 6,600 ft	Luzon
26	Apayao	Mount Lungod	1,919 m 6,296 ft	Luzon
27	Agusan del Norte	Mount Hilong-hilong	2,012 m 6,601 ft	Mindanao
28	Aurora	Mount Mingan	1,901 m 6,237 ft	Luzon
29	Cagayan	Mount Cetaceo	1,823 m 5,981 ft	Luzon
30	Quirino	Mount Dianalese	1,808 m 5,932 ft	Luzon
31	Isabela	Mount Dos Cuernos	1,785 m 5,856 ft	Luzon
32	Nueva Ecija	Mount Kemalugong	1,750 m 5,740 ft	Luzon
33	Davao Oriental	Mount Mayo	1,727 m 5,666 ft	Mindanao
34	Caminguin	Mount Mambajao	1,713 m 5,620 ft	Camiguin
35	Agusan del Sur	Mount Datu Masuyapa	1,678m 5,505 ft	Mindanao
36	Pangasinan	Mount Malico	1,675 m 5,495 ft	Luzon
37	Tarlac	Mount Iba	1,655 m 5,430 ft	Luzon
38	Davao Occidental	Mount Latian	1,624 m 5,328 ft	Mindanao
39	Sorsogon	Mount Bulusan	1,565 m 5,135 ft	Luzon
40	Camarines Norte	Mount Labo	1,544 m 5,066 ft	Luzon
41	Lanao del Norte	Mount Inayawan	1,535 m 5,036 ft	Mindanao
42	Zamboanga del Sur	Mount Pinukis	1,532 m 5,026 ft	Mindanao
43	La Union	Mount Talalang	1,520 m 4,990 ft	Luzon
44	Sultan Kudarat	Mount Pitot Kalabaw	1,503 m 4,931 ft	Mindanao
45	Pampanga	Mount Pinatubo	1,486 m 4,875 ft	Luzon
46	Rizal	Mount Irid	1,448 m 4,751 ft	Luzon
47	Bataan	Mount Mariveles	1,398 m 4,587 ft	Luzon
48	Iloilo	Mount Inaman	1,396m 4,580 ft	Panay
49	Biliran	Mount Maliwatan	1,346 m 4,416 ft	Biliran
50	Leyte	Alto Peak (Mount Aminduen)	1,325 m 4,347 ft	Leyte
51	Maguindanao del Norte	Mount Blik	1,231 m 4,039 ft	Mindanao
52	Bulacan	Mount Oriod	1,206 m 3,957 ft	Luzon
53	Marinduque	Mount Malindig	1,157 m 3,796 ft	Marinduque
54	Davao del Norte	Mount Masimalon	1,115 m 3,658 ft	Mindanao
55	Surigao del Norte	Mount Legaspi	1,095 m 3,593 ft	Mindanao
56	Batangas	Mount Makiling	1,090 m 3,580 ft	Luzon
57	Cebu	Osmeña Peak	1,015 m 3,330 ft	Cebu
58	Batanes	Mount Iraya	1,009 m 3,310 ft	Batan
59	Basilan	Basilan Peak	998 m 3,274 ft	Basilan
60	Southern Leyte	Mount Bitanjuan	965 m 3,166 ft	Leyte
61	Dinagat Islands	Mount Redondo	939 m 3,081 ft	Dinagat
62	Zamboanga Sibugay	Quipit Peak	899 m 2,949 ft	Mindanao
63	Samar	Mount Huraw	890 m 2,920 ft	Samar
64	Bohol	Mount Matunog	864 m 2,835 ft	Bohol
65	Cavite	Mount Sungay	716 m 2,349 ft	Luzon
66	Catanduanes	Mount Tamboo	695 m 2,280 ft	Catanduanes
67	Masbate	Conical Peak	684 m 2,244 ft	Masbate
68	Eastern Samar	Mount Mactaon	673 m 2,208 ft	Samar
69	Zamboanga del Norte	Mount Dansalan	628 m 2,060 ft	Mindanao
69	Siquijor	Mount Malabahoc	628 m 2,060 ft	Siquijor
70	Surigao del Sur	Mount Diuata	609 m 1,998 ft	Mindanao
71	Tawi-Tawi	Mount Sibangkat	552 m 1,811 ft	Tawi-Tawi
72	Northern Samar	Mount Saamong	514 m 1,686 ft	Samar
73	Guimaras	Mount Bontoc	272 m 892 ft	Guimaras
74	Metro Manila	Unnamed point	240 m 787 ft	Luzon

== See also ==
- List of mountains in the Philippines
