= Mount Balatukan =

Compound stratovolcano in Mindanao, Philippines

- Mount Balatocan; Mount Balingoan
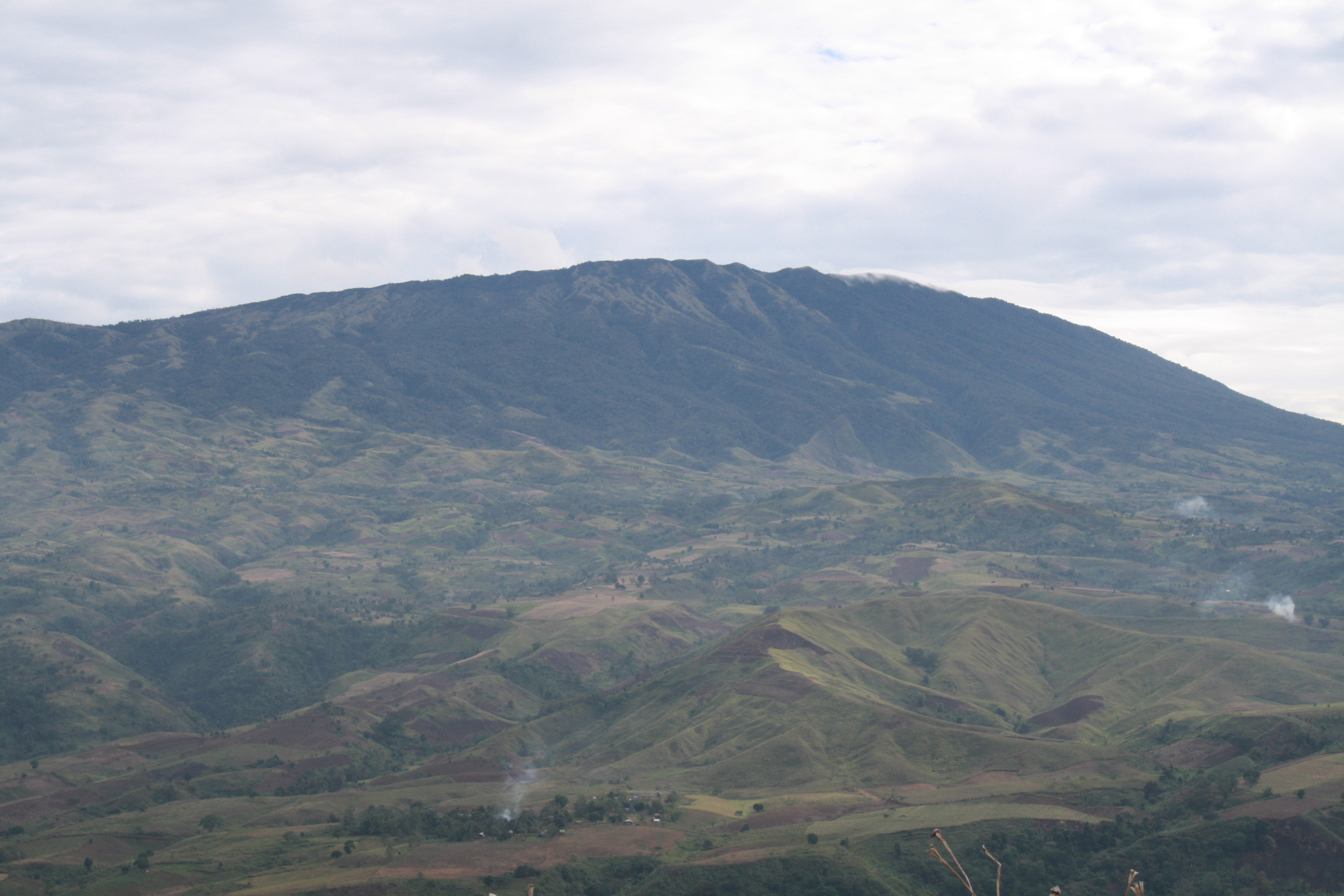
- The mountain as seen from the western side

Highest point
- Elevation: 2,450 m (8,040 ft)
- Prominence: 1,244 m (4,081 ft)
- Listing: Philippines highest peaks; 31st; Philippines Ultra peaks 16th Philippines Ribus 42nd; Misamis Oriental highest point; Potentially active volcano
- Coordinates: 8°46′12″N 124°58′48″E

Geography
- Location within Mindanao mainland Location within Philippines
- Country: Philippines
- Region: Northern Mindanao
- Province: Misamis Oriental
- City/municipality: Balingasag; Gingoog

Geology
- Rock age: Holocene
- Mountain type: Compound stratovolcano
- Volcanic arc: Central Mindanao Arc
- Last eruption: Pleistocene age

Mount Balatukan is a potentially active compound stratovolcano in the Southern island of Mindanao, Philippines. It is the highest point in the province of Misamis Oriental. The volcano has no historical eruptions but displays fumarolic activity. The 2,450-metre (8,040 ft) mountain is topped by a triangular shaped caldera 15 kilometers (9.3 mi) long and 10.6 kilometers (6.6 mi) at its widest. The Balatocan River emanates from and drains the huge crater.

The mountain is a protected area in the country classified as a Natural Park, the Mount Balatukan Range Natural Park. The park has an area of 8,040.00 hectares (19,867.3 acres) with a buffer zone of 1,222.00 hectares (3,019.6 acres). It was created on March 6, 2007 by Proclamation no. 1249.

== Location ==
Mount Balatukan is wholly located in Province of Misamis Oriental in the Northern Mindanao region of the Philippines. The coastal road between Balingasag, Misamis Oriental and Gingoog rims the northern perimeter of the mountain on the north coast of Mindanao.

== Physical features ==
Mount Balatukan is a stratovolcano with a listed elevation of 2,450 meters (8,040 ft) asl (GVP). The Philippine Institute of Volcanology and Seismology (PHIVOLCS).

Satellite imagery shows it to be densely forested peninsula jutting north into the Bohol Sea.

== Volcanism ==
There are no historical eruptions on Mount Balatukan. The age of its last eruption has not been studied, although some lava flows on the sides of the mountain are determined as Pleistocene. Fumarolic activity is present on the mountain, but its form displays extensive erosion.

Balatukan is part of the Central Mindanao Arc of volcanoes. Its northernmost tip called Sipaka Point, which points to the northeast, is a 267 meters (876 ft) cinder cone on a small peninsula called Mount Sipaka.

== Listings ==
The Global Volcanism Program lists the last activity of Balatukan as Holocene but Uncertain.

The Philippine Institute of Volcanology and Seismology (Phivolcs) lists Balatukan as Inactive, even though the volcano displays fumarolic activity.

== Mythology ==
In Bukidnon mythology, it is believed that upon death, all seven makatu (souls of a single person) combine into one and journeys into Mount Balatucan for final judgment. The soul first travels to the huge rock, Liyang, which is followed by a journey to Binagbasan, where the Tree of Records grows. After making a mark on the tree, the soul journeys to Pinagsayawan, where the soul must dance and sweat for atonement. The next journey is to Panamparan, where the soul gets a haircut to be presentable at Kumbirahan, where a banquet awaits the soul. The god Andalapit then leads the soul to the foot of Mount Balatucan, where the gods of the dead assemble to judge the soul. Good souls are sent to Dunkituhan, the cloud capped stairway that leads into heaven at the summit of Balatucan. An evil soul is sent to a river of penance for atonement until forgiven. Souls at the river sweat blood, the source of the river’s color and fishy scent. A forgiven soul afterwards also goes into Balatucan’s summit.

== See also ==
- List of active volcanoes in the Philippines
- List of inactive volcanoes in the Philippines
- List of potentially active volcanoes in the Philippines
- List of natural parks of the Philippines
- List of protected areas of the Philippines
- Pacific ring of fire
