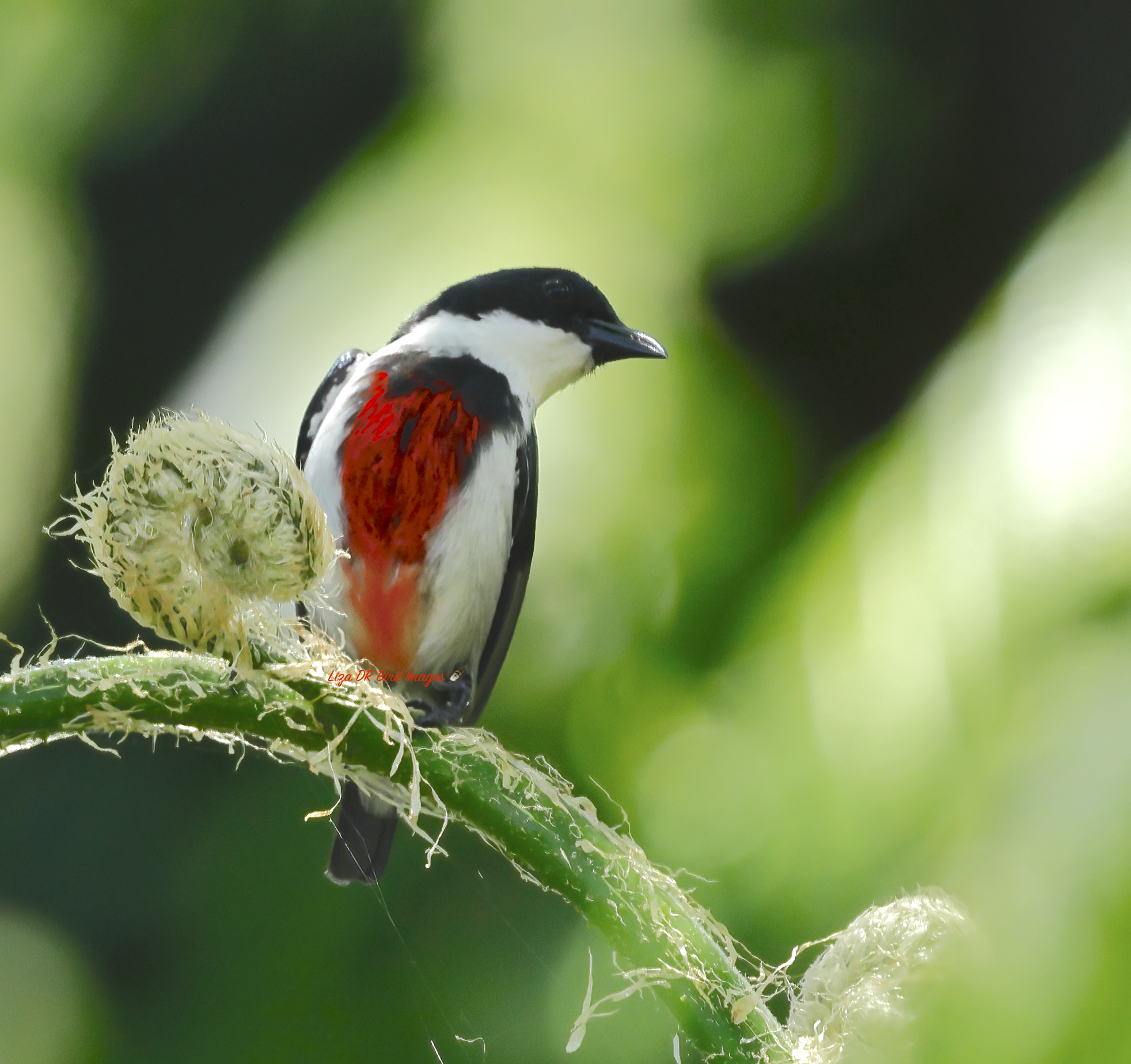

Conservation status
- Least Concern (IUCN 3.1)

Scientific classification
- Kingdom: Animalia
- Phylum: Chordata
- Class: Aves
- Order: Passeriformes
- Family: Dicaeidae
- Genus: Dicaeum
- Species: D. haematostictum

Binomial name
- Dicaeum haematostictum Sharpe, 1876

= Black-belted flowerpecker =

Species of bird

The black-belted flowerpecker (Dicaeum haematostictum), or Visayan flowerpecker, is a species of bird in the family Dicaeidae. It is endemic to the Philippines where it is restricted to Panay, Negros and Guimaras islands. It was formerly regarded as a subspecies of the more widespread red-keeled flowerpecker (D. australe). Sometimes the name red-keeled flowerpecker is used for D. haematostictum and D. australe is then known as the red-sided flowerpecker.

== Description and taxonomy ==
It was formerly conspecific with the red-keeled flowerpecker but differs greatly in plumage mainly by the black band and much more extensive red on its chest. Previously name red-keeled flowerpecker is used for what is now referred to as black-belted flowerpecker D. haematostictum and what is now the red-keeled flowerpecker (D. australe) was then known as the red-sided flowerpecker. This species is monotypic.

== Ecology and behavior ==
It is seen feeding on flowering and fruiting trees.

Nests have been found from March to September. Nests are 7 to 11 meters (23 to 36 ft) above ground on branches or tree ferns. Lays 1 plae greenish white and spotted egg.

== Habitat and conservation status ==
It inhabits tropical moist lowland forest up to 1,000 meters (3,300 ft) above sea level. It prefers primary forest and secondary forest but has been known to visit cultivations and coconut plantations

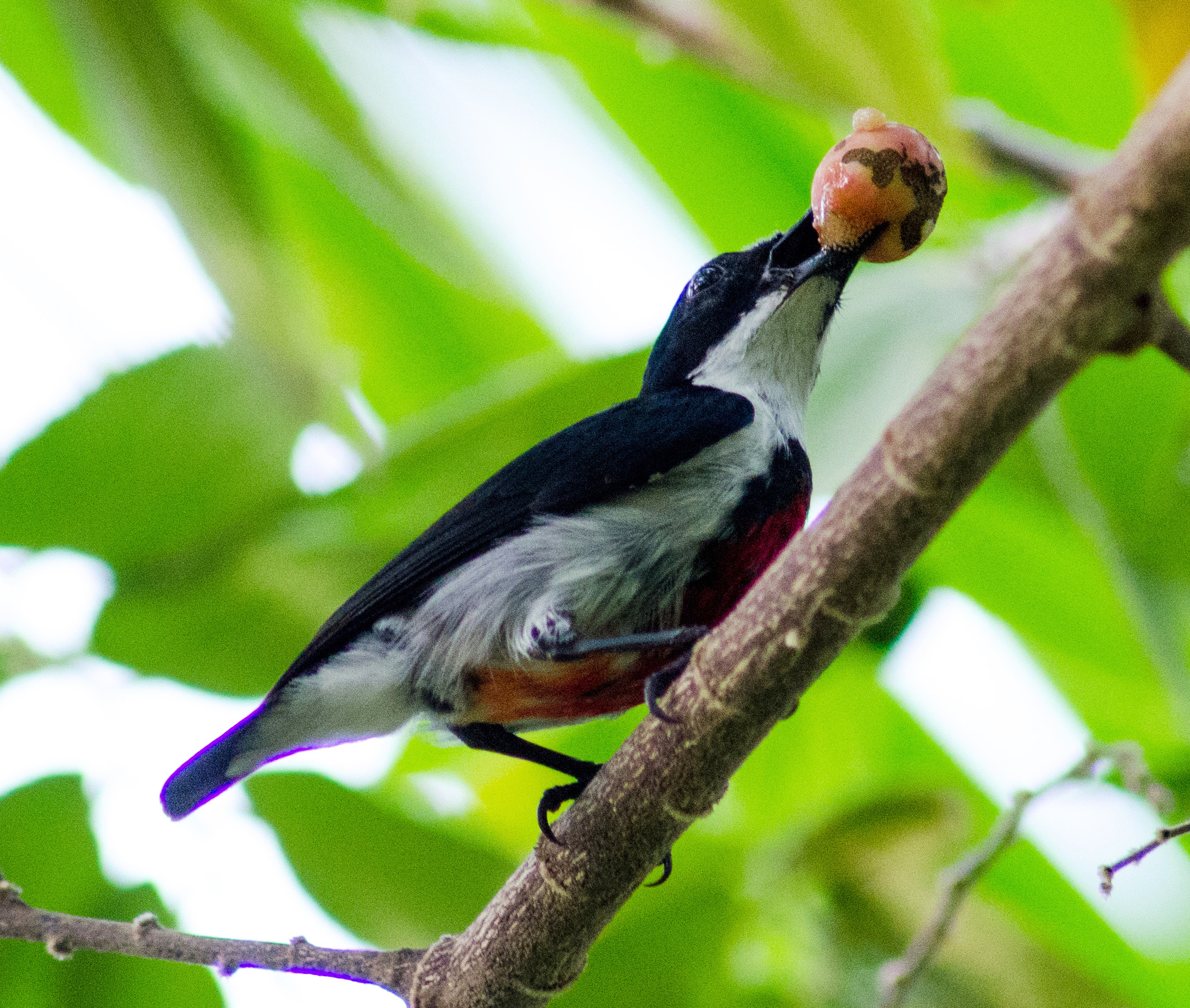
Feeding on a hagimit (Ficus minahassae)

IUCN has assessed this bird as least concern but was formerly Vulnerable due to extensive habitat loss on its range. Habitat loss on both Panay and Negros has been extensive. Primary forests have been almost totally destroyed on Negros (where just 4% of any type of forest cover remained in 1988) and Panay (where 8% remained). Habitat degradation, through clearance for agriculture, timber and charcoal-burning, continues to pose a serious threat to remaining fragments. It is already possibly extinct on Guimaras. However, more surveys revealed that this species is common even in degraded habitats and plantations and thus was downlisted to least concern.

It occurs on a few protected areas Northern Negros Natural Park and Mt. Canlaon National Park and Balinsasayao Twin Lakes Natural Park.

Conservation actions proposed include to conduct surveys in potentially suitable habitat in order to calculate density estimates, and calculate remaining extent of suitable habitat to refine the population estimate and promote areas where it is present to be protected. Promote more effective protection of the Northern Negros Natural Park and other remaining lowland forest tracts in the Western Visayas.
