= Mount Malindang =

Volcano in Misamis Occidental, Philippines

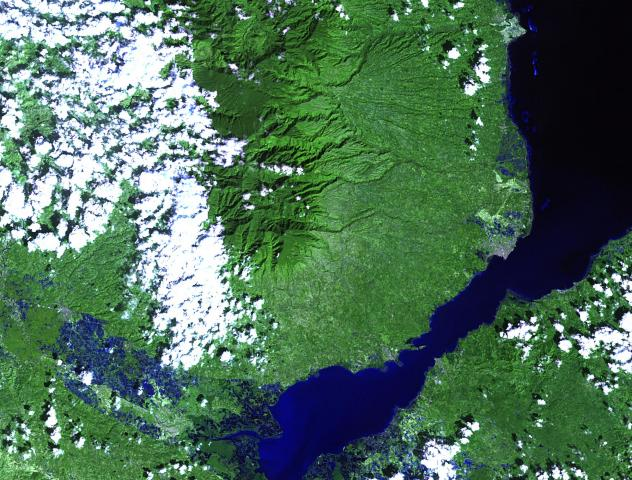
- Landsat image of Mount Malindang and its vicinity

Highest point
- Elevation: 2,404 m (7,887 ft)
- Prominence: 2,290 m (7,510 ft)
- Listing: Philippines highest peaks; 32nd; Philippines ultra peaks 8th; Ribu; Misamis Occidental highest point; Inactive volcano
- Coordinates: 8°13′03″N 123°38′12″E

Geography
- Location within Mindanao mainland Location within Philippines
- Country: Philippines
- Region: Northern Mindanao
- Province: Misamis Occidental
- Parent range: Malindang Mountain Range

Geology
- Mountain types: Complex volcano; Stratovolcano
- Volcanic arc: Sulu-Zamboanga Arc
- Last eruption: 1819 (unofficial) possibly in 1822

Climbing
- First ascent: Maj. E.A. Mearns, W.I. Hutchinson, and party in May 1906

Mount Malindang is a complex volcano located in the province of Misamis Occidental in the southern island of Mindanao, Philippines. It is the highest point in the province. The least studied mountain range was formed through several volcanic activities some of which could be historical, evident by the presence of two calderas, surrounded by high rock walls, cinder cones, dome volcano plugs, two sulfurous hot springs, and a crater lake named Lake Duminagat. The amphitheater structures have extensive distribution of volcanic rocks, carbonized wood that are found in pyroclastic deposits. The mountain range is dissected by several canyons and ravines.

== Classification ==
Mount Malindang has unofficially historical eruptions but it was believed to be in 1822 and is classified as inactive by the Philippine Institute of Volcanology and Seismology.

== Mount Malindang Natural Park ==
Mount Malindang and the whole Malindang Mountain Range's alluring qualities come from its waterfalls, crater lake and dense virgin forests which host diverse and rare species of flora and fauna. On June 19, 1971, the area was proclaimed as Mount Malindang National Park by virtue of Republic Act 6266. Under the establishment of National Integrated Protected Areas System (NIPAS) in 1992, the park was reclassified and was renamed as Mount Malindang Range Natural Park on August 2, 2002, through Proclamation No. 228.

The park encompasses three provinces – Misamis Occidental, Zamboanga del Sur and Zamboanga del Norte – covering an area of 53,262 hectares (131,610 acres) of which about 33,000 hectares (82,000 acres) or 62% of forest remaining. About 20,000 hectares (49,000 acres) are cultivated and inhabited by indigenous people mostly the Subanon tribe.

=== Fauna ===
The national park is known to harbor a rich and unique biodiversity that is yet to be explored. The mountain and its outlying areas, some unexplored, are home to some of the endemic and endangered species in the Philippines, which include:.

- Greater Mindanao shrew (Crocidura grandis)
- Tarsier (Carlito syrichta)
- Flying lemur (Cynocephalus volans)
- Long-tailed macaque (Macaca fascicularis)
- Philippine deer (Cervus mariannus)
- Asian palm civet (Paradoxurus hermaphroditus subsp. philippinensis)
- Philippine warty pig (Sus philippensis)
- Rough-armed tree frog (Kurixalus appendiculatus)
- Marbled water monitor (Varanus marmoratus)
- Philippine hawk-eagle (Nisaetus philippensis)
- Philippine eagle (Pithecophaga jefferyi)
- Rufous hornbill (Buceros hydrocorax)
- Philippine hanging parakeet/colasisi (Loriculus philippensis)
- Philippine pygmy woodpecker (Dendrocopos maculatus)

== Economic importance ==
Mount Malindang and its adjoining mountain range including Dapitan Peak and Mt. Bliss, is a catchment area which drains water through 49 rivers and streams, and numerous creeks. It provides potable water for domestic, agricultural and other uses to more than one million inhabitants of Misamis Occidental and the eastern parts of Zamboanga del Norte and Zamboanga del Sur.

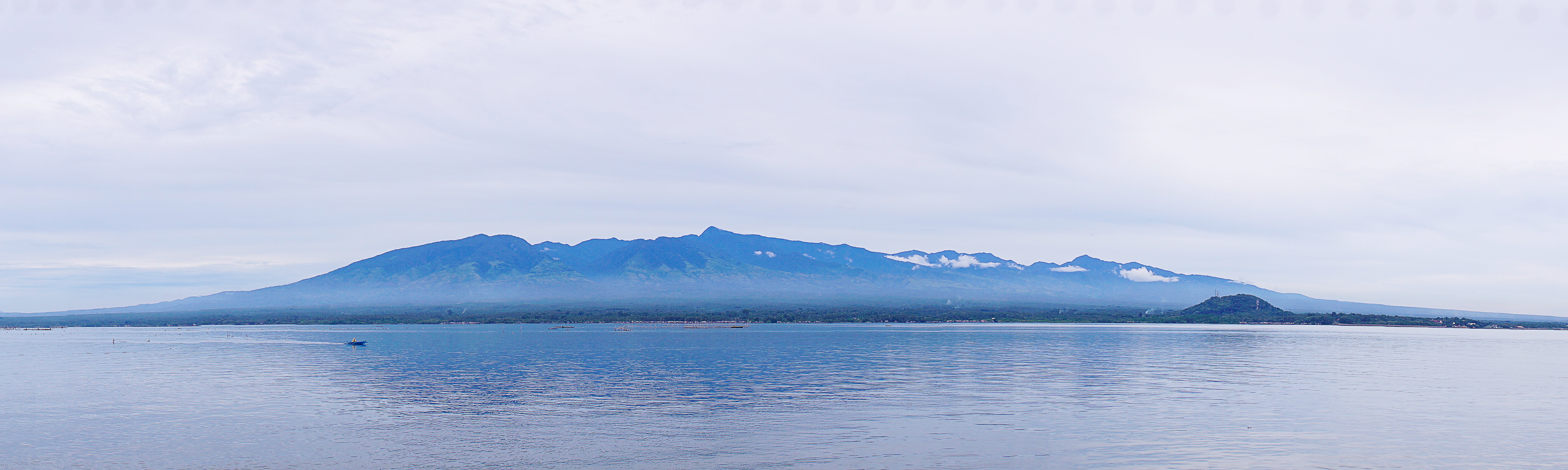
Mount Malindang panorama

== ASEAN Heritage Park ==
Declared as Association of Southeast Asian Nations (ASEAN) Heritage Park (AHP), during the 13th Informal ASEAN Ministerial Meeting on the Environment held October 13, 2011, in Cambodia. The three other Philippine AHPs are Mount Iglit-Baco National Park in Mindoro, Mount Kitanglad Range in Bukidnon, and Mount Apo Natural Park in Davao.

It was officially launched on August 4, 2012, during the 2nd National ASEAN Heritage Park (AHP) Conference, sponsored by the ASEAN Center for Bio-diversity (ACB) at Oroquieta City.

== See also ==
- List of active volcanoes in the Philippines
- List of potentially active volcanoes in the Philippines
- List of inactive volcanoes in the Philippines
- List of protected areas of the Philippines
- List of ultras of the Philippines
