= Mount Halcon =

Mountain in Mindoro

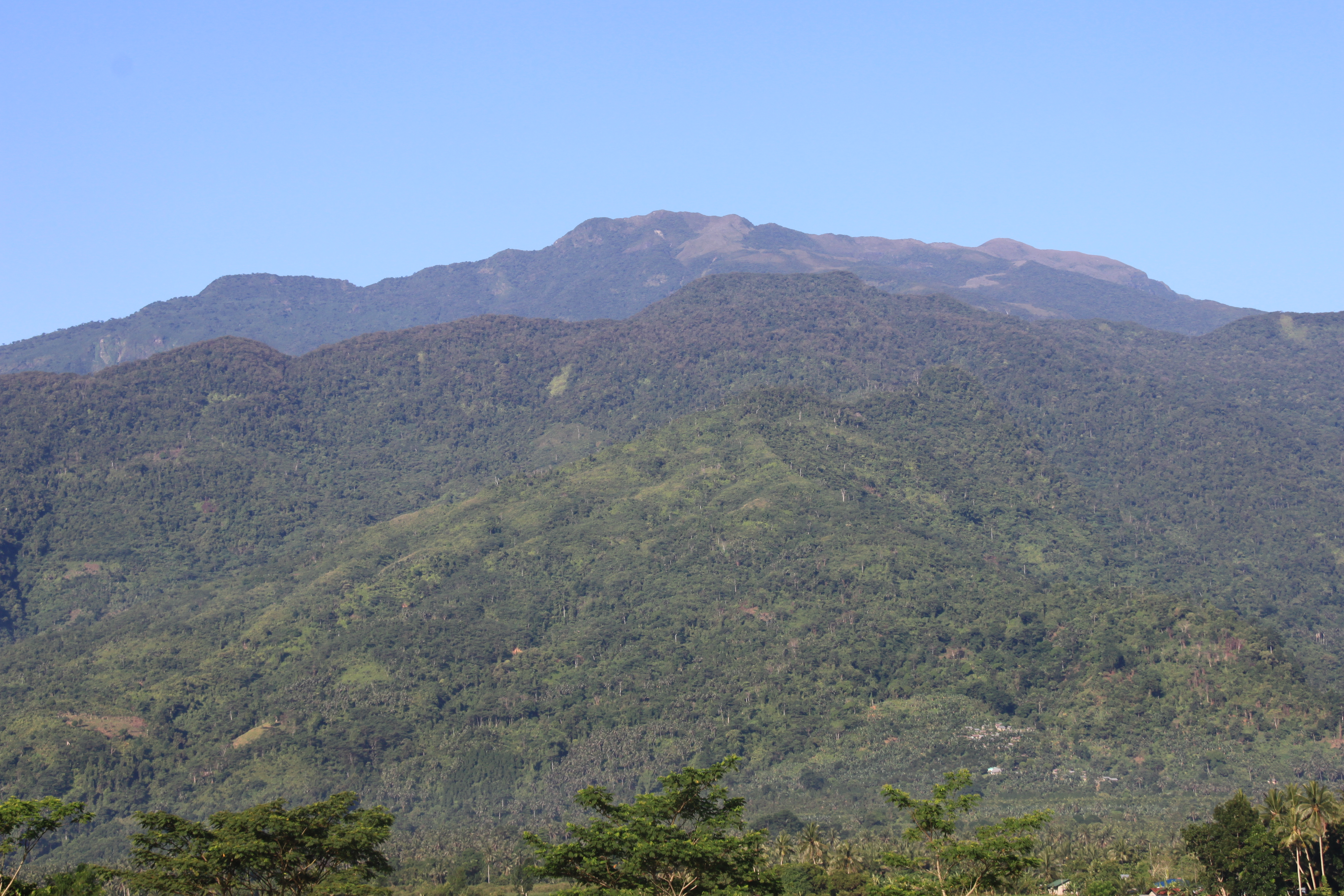
- View of Mt. Halcon from Barangay Dulangan II

Highest point
- Elevation: 2,616 m (8,583 ft)
- Prominence: 2,616 m (8,583 ft)
- Listing: Island highest point 37th; Philippines highest peaks 23rd; Philippines Ultra peaks 3rd; Philippines Ribu peaks 3rd; Mimaropa highest point
- Coordinates: 13°15′00″N 120°59′00″E

Geography
- Location within Luzon Location within Philippines
- Country: Philippines
- Region: Mimaropa
- Province: Oriental Mindoro
- City/municipality: Baco
- Parent range: Mindoro Mountain Range

Climbing
- First ascent: 1906 by American botanist Elmer Drew Merrill and company.

Mount Halcon (Filipino: Bundok Halcon) and (Spanish: Monte Halcón) is the highest mountain in Mindoro. According to the new data released by Oriental Mindoro peakvisor as of 2022, it has an elevation of 2,616 metres (8,583 ft) above sea level, higher than the previous estimates of 2,586 m (8,484 ft) although no official survey has yet confirmed this. It is the 23rd-highest peak in the Philippines and 37th-highest peak of an island on Earth. Its steep slopes have earned it the reputation of being one of the most difficult and technically most challenging mountains to climb in the Philippines. The first documented ascent was made in 1906 by American botanist Elmer Drew Merrill and a party of forestry and military personnel.

== Inhabitants ==
Mount Halcon is home to the indigenous Alangan Mangyans.

== Flora and fauna ==
Its thick vegetation contains much flora and fauna, including the critically endangered Mindoro bleeding-heart which is endemic to the area, and the stick insect Conlephasma enigma, which was first described in 2012.

== History ==
The mountain was also the location of a possible World War II Japanese holdout. Isao Miyazawa found evidence that his comrade Captain Fumio Nakahara was living there in 1957. Another search in 1977 was called off due to Miyazawa contracting malaria. In 1980, Miyazawa found Nakahara's hut, and the natives talked to him extensively about the foreigner. However, Nakahara himself has never been spotted.

== See also ==
- List of ultras of the Philippines
- List of islands by highest point
