= Kanlaon =

Active volcano in the Philippines

Mount Kanlaon
- Kanlaon Volcano
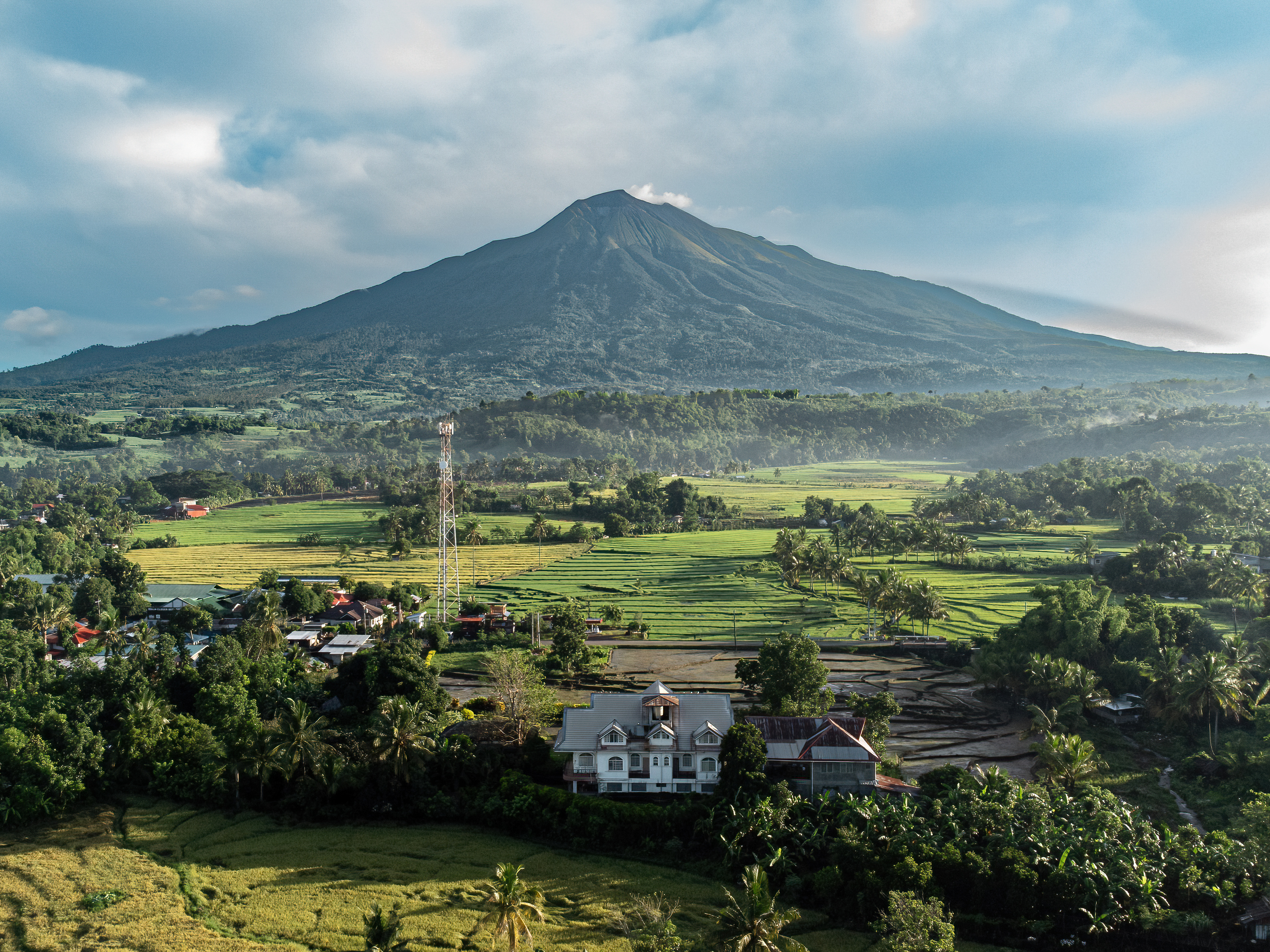
- Mt. Kanlaon as seen from La Castellana, Negros Occidental

Highest point
- Elevation: 2,465 m (8,087 ft)
- Prominence: 2,465 m (8,087 ft)
- Listing: Island high points 43rd; Philippines highest peaks; 27th; Philippines Ultra peaks 7th; Philippines Ribus 5th; Visayas highest peak; Active volcano
- Coordinates: 10°24′40″N 123°07′54″E

Geography
- Location within Visayas Location within Philippines
- Country: Philippines
- Region: Negros Island Region
- Provinces: Negros Occidental; Negros Oriental
- City/municipality: Canlaon; La Carlota; La Castellana; Murcia; San Carlos

Geology
- Mountain type: Stratovolcano
- Volcanic belt: Negros Volcanic Belt
- Last eruption: October 10, 2026

Kanlaon, also known as Mount Kanlaon and Kanlaon Volcano (Hiligaynon: Bolkang Kanglaon; Cebuano: Bolkang Kanglaon; Filipino: Bulkang Kanlaon), is an active andesitic stratovolcano and the highest mountain on the island of Negros in the Philippines, as well as the highest peak in the Visayas, with an elevation of 2,465 m (8,087 ft) above sea level. Mount Kanlaon ranks as the 42nd-highest peak of an island in the world.

The volcano straddles the provinces of Negros Occidental and Negros Oriental, approximately 30 km (19 mi) southeast of Bacolod, the capital and most populous city of Negros Occidental and the whole island. It is one of the active volcanoes in the Philippines and part of the Pacific Ring of Fire.

== Etymology ==
The name "Kanlaon" means "[place] of Laon", a pre-colonial Visayan goddess of creation, agriculture, and justice. The name Laon itself means "the ancient one", from Visayan laon, meaning "ancient" or "old."

During the late Spanish colonial period of the Philippines, the volcano was briefly renamed as Malaspina by the Spanish, after the Spanish explorer Alejandro Malaspina of the Malaspina Expedition (1789–1794).

== Geography and geology ==
Kanlaon has a peak elevation of 2,465 m (8,087 ft), although it is reported as 2,435 m (7,989 ft) in some sources, with a base diameter of 30 km (19 mi), and is dotted with pyroclastic cones and extinct craters extending to the north-northwest. It is part of the Negros volcanic belt resulting from the subduction of Sulu Sea basin lithosphere of the Sunda plate along the Negros Trench and has been an active subduction zone since the Miocene.

Just below and north of the summit is the active Lugud crater. North of Lugud is a 2 by 0.8 km (1.24 by 0.50 mi) crater known as Margaja Valley, with a small, often seasonal crater lake. The volcano is estimated to have an area of 24,557.60 ha (245.5760 km^{2}).

The area of the volcano is host to two distinct geothermal systems;

- a long established system which includes the Pataan thermal area, and which is characterized by neutral sodium and potassium chloride and bicarbonate containing waters
- an immature system, represented by Hagdan spring characterized by acid-sulfate waters.

The Mambukal Hot Springs which are at the far north–east, has mixed waters from these two system types. Other hot springs on its slopes are the Bucalan hot spring to the south-west of the summit, and Bungol hot spring.

Its adjacent volcanic edifices are Mount Silay and Mount Mandalagan, north of Kanlaon.

La Carlota, La Castellana, Murcia, and San Carlos share the Negros Occidental side of the volcano, while Canlaon, the component city that has jurisdiction on the Negros Oriental side of the volcano, lies on its lower slope about 8.5 km (5.3 mi) ESE of the summit.

== Volcanic activity ==
The most active volcano in the Visayas, Kanlaon has erupted more than 40 times since 1819. Eruptions are typically phreatic of small-to-moderate size that produce minor ash falls around the volcano. In 1902, the eruption was classified as Strombolian, typified by the ejection of incandescent cinders, lapilli, lava bombs and gas fumes.

Volcanic activity at Kanlaon is continuously monitored by the Philippine Institute of Volcanology and Seismology (PHIVOLCS), the government's bureau that monitors the volcanoes and earthquakes in the nation, although unlike Mayon and Pinatubo, the volcano has never been studied in-depth and its age is not yet accurately calculated. Kanlaon Volcano Observatory is located at the campus of La Carlota City College in Barangay Cubay, La Carlota, Negros Occidental.

=== 1996 ===
On August 10, 24 mountain climbers hiked the volcano when Kanlaon erupted without warning, killing British student Julian Green and Filipinos Noel Tragico and Neil Perez, who were trapped near the summit close to the crater. The local authorities rescued 17 others, including 10 Belgians, another British climber and six Filipinos while Edwin Ematong, a member of the Negros Mountaineering Club Inc. and who, along with his cousin Neil Perez, guided the British Nationals survived the eruption, having descended the volcano ahead of his group.

One of the rescued Belgians, Caroline Verlinde, said she and her group were about to leave a site near the crater rim when suddenly the volcano ejected ash, stones and hot gas. She ran to a tree for cover and saw her friends being hit by falling hot tephra. She said their Filipino guide told them the smoke billowing out from the crater "was just ordinary."

=== 2001 ===
PHIVOLCS noted in a March 22 report that since January, earthquake clusters or occurrences had been recorded by the seismic monitoring network around the volcano. These earthquakes might have signified a reactivation of the volcanic system at depth and could be a precursor to more vigorous activity, such as ash explosions. This interpretation was based on similar earthquake clusters manifested prior to the 1996 phreatic explosion from the active summit crater of the volcano. In view of the possibility of a sudden ash ejection, PHIVOLCS recommended the immediate suspension of all treks to the summit crater until further notice.

=== 2002 ===
An increase in seismic activity during February to April was followed by raising alert on the volcano. An ash eruption occurred on November 28.

=== 2003 ===
On March 17, a gray plume was observed above Kanlaon. Small eruptions produced plumes that rose 100 meters (330 ft) above the crater of the volcano. A total of 46 minor ash ejections were recorded. After July 23, only weak emission was noted and seismic activity returned to normal.

=== 2005 ===
A brief phreatic ash eruption occurred on January 21, producing a 500 meters (1,600 ft) high ash plume. A fine layer of ash fell on Cabagnaan, 5.5 kilometers (3.4 mi) SW of the crater. Ash emissions began again on March 20 and caused minor ashfall in 5-kilometer (3.1 mi) W of the volcano. Until April 4, occasional ash eruptions reached 1 km above the volcano, and small ash fall was reported in La Castellana (16 kilometers (9.9 mi) SW of the crater), Upper Sag-ang, Yubo (5–6 kilometers (3.1–3.7 mi) SW), and Guintubdan (5–6 kilometers (3.1–3.7 mi) WNW). Ash eruptions stopped after May 25.

=== 2006 ===
On June 3, Kanlaon again exhibited restiveness and spewed steam and ash. Alert Level 1 was issued on June 12. Until July 25, a total of 23 ash eruptions were reported. All eruptions were phreatic (i.e. no fresh magma was ejected), and ejected ash and steam up to 2 km (1.2 mi) above the crater. No significant seismic activity had occurred before or after the ash emissions, indicating the explosions were near surface hydrothermal events.

=== 2008 ===
On February 10, PHIVOLCS issued an alert stating that the seismic network at Kanlaon recorded a total of 21 low frequency volcanic earthquakes (LFVQ) during the past 24 hours. Due to the increasing number of recorded volcanic earthquakes, PHIVOLCS raised Kanlaon Volcano's alert status from Alert Level 0 to Alert Level 1, which means the volcano is at slightly elevated unrest and volcanic activity could lead to steam and ash ejections. A 4-kilometer (2.5 mi) Permanent Danger Zone (PDZ) was maintained around the volcano, as sudden explosions may occur without warning, but no eruptions occurred.

=== 2009 ===
From August 23 to September 1, 257 volcanic earthquakes were recorded. Epicenters of the recorded quakes were clustered at the north-west slope which may indicate movement of an active local fault at the slope induced by pressure beneath the volcano. Surface observations did not show any significant change in the steam emission from the crater. PHIVOLCS maintained the alert status at Level 0.

=== 2015 ===
On November 23, Kanlaon had a small, steam-driven explosion. PHIVOLCS raised the alert level to 1 (mild restiveness). On December 12, Kanlaon had two low energy ash eruptions. The minor ash eruption of the volcano reached as high as 984 ft (300 m). On December 27, an ash eruption occurred at Kanlaon's active crater. The eruption plume reached as high as 3,281 ft (1,000 m). Light ashfall were reported in some barangays near Kanlaon Volcano.

=== 2016 ===
On March 29 at 6:20 pm, Kanlaon erupted for 12 minutes which produced a volcanic plume 1,500 m (4,900 ft) above the crater and a "booming sound" was heard in some barangays near the volcano. According to the police department of Canlaon, several fire balls, which were coming from the crater of the volcano, started to flow following a booming sound and causing a bush fire. PHIVOLCS issued alert level number 1. No casualties were reported.

=== 2020 ===
On March 11, PHIVOLCS raised the volcano's alert level from 0 to 1 due to its abnormal activities since March 9. 80 volcanic earthquakes were plotted since then. On June 21, the volcano showed some signs of increased unrest. By June 22, the volcano's activity continued, with a series of tectonic earthquakes ranging from M3.2 to M4.7. A total of 278 earthquakes was observed for a 72-hour period (from June 21, 8AM – June 24, 8AM), possibly related to the magmatic activity underneath the volcano. Earthquakes continued, with steam and fumarolic activity rising 200–300 meters above. PHIVOLCS reminded the public to stay away to the 4-km PDZ (Permanent Danger Zone) around the volcano, as abnormal conditions and sudden phreatic explosions might occur.

=== 2024–2026 ===
Kanlaon erupted on December 9, 2024, releasing a plume of volcanic ash and pyroclastic flow that reached 4,000 m (13,000 ft)

On June 3, PHIVOLCS raised the alert level of Kanlaon from alert level 1 to alert level 2, indicating increasing unrest after an explosive eruption occurred on its summit vent at 6:51 p.m. PST. The eruption produced a voluminous and incandescent plume that rose 5,000 m (16,000 ft) above the vent and a probable short pyroclastic density current (PDC) of approximately 2-3 km down the south and southeastern slopes of the volcano. The eruption lasted for six minutes and was followed by a relatively strong volcanic earthquake. Sulfurous odors and ashfall were reported by communities on the western slope of the volcano, particularly in Bago, La Carlota, La Castellana and Canlaon, and as far as Bacolod, 85 km (53 mi) away. Particles from the volcano were deposited in the form of haze as far as the Bicol Region. On June 5, rains triggered lahar flows in La Castellana.

Evacuations were ordered in Canlaon for five barangays near the volcano and communities located along rivers flowing from the volcano, as well as in La Carlota and La Castellana. A mask mandate was also imposed in San Carlos. At least 4,752 people were displaced, while offices in Canlaon were ordered closed on June 4. Authorities in Negros Occidental were also placed on heightened alert, with ashfall warnings declared in Canlaon, La Carlota and La Castellana. At least 29 flights at Ninoy Aquino International Airport as well as in Iloilo, Cebu, Kalibo, Bacolod, Davao, Cagayan de Oro, General Santos and San Jose Airports were cancelled due to the eruption. On June 4, several flights were cancelled and a mandatory emergency evacuation within a 3-kilometer radius was ordered. Canlaon Mayor Jose Chubasco Cardenas said that 23,622 residents of five barangays were affected. A state of calamity was declared in Canlaon and La Castellana. Around 23,000 hectares of sugarcane fields in Negros Island were affected by the eruption, while a curfew and water rationing was imposed in La Carlota and La Castellana due to sulfur contamination in regular sources. Damages in agriculture were estimated at ₱104.8 million, while 3,890.5 metric tons of crops were lost and at least 3,421 animals and livestock died.

On July 15, PHIVOLCS issued a notice regarding the increasing swelling of Kanlaon's edifice, which has been persisting since mid-June. PHIVOLCS noted that this ongoing ground deformation could indicate magmatic intrusion, potentially increasing the likelihood of eruptive activity.

On September 9, PHIVOLCS reported a series of volcano-tectonic earthquakes from the volcano. On September 10, PHIVOLCS recorded its highest recorded sulfur dioxide emissions in Kanlaon since 2009, at 9,985 tonnes, prompting it to raise warnings over the volcano possibly undergoing its first magmatic eruption since 1902. As a result, at least 248 people were evacuated in Canlaon. The record was surpassed the next day, when 11,556 tons of sulfur dioxide was emitted.

On December 9, PHIVOLCS raised alert 3 over Kanlaon after an explosive eruption occurred at the summit vent at 3:03 p.m. The eruption produced a large plume that rose 3,000 m (9,800 ft) and drifted west-southwest, with pyroclastic flow moving down the southeastern side of the volcano. The eruption generated ashfall that affected areas as far as Panay and Guimaras. Around 87,000 people were evacuated, including 46,900 in La Castellana.

On December 25, PHIVOLCS reported an increase in sulfur dioxide emissions from Kanlaon Volcano, measuring 6,014 tons compared to 3,585 tons on the previous day. Elevated sulfur dioxide emissions are typically associated with rising magma and may indicate the potential for further volcanic activity.

As of January 11, 2025, Kanlaon Volcano, located on Negros Island in the Philippines, remains under Alert Level 3 as declared by the Philippine Institute of Volcanology and Seismology (Phivolcs). This alert level indicates heightened volcanic unrest, with the potential for sudden and hazardous eruptions. Phivolcs continues to closely monitor the volcano's activity.

On April 8, 2025, an explosive eruption occurred at the summit vent of Kanlaon Volcano that began at 5:51 AM. The eruption produced a voluminous bent plume approximately 4,000 meters tall that is drifting southwest. Pyroclastic density currents or PDCs descended the slopes on the general southern edifice based on IP and thermal camera monitors. Debris from the eruption ignited vegetation around the volcano and triggered wildfires.

Phivolcs advises the public to avoid entry into the 4-kilometer Permanent Danger Zone (PDZ) due to the risk of sudden explosions and hazardous volcanic flows. Communities surrounding the volcano are urged to remain vigilant and adhere to any evacuation orders or advisories from local authorities.

On 13 May 2025, Phivolcs posted a bulletin regarding "a moderately explosive eruption" lasting 5 minutes. Projectiles and burning vegetation was observed, as well as ash in multiple localities of Negros Occidental. Phivolcs recommended a 6 kilometer evacuation zone (3.7 mi).

On October 12, 2025, PHIVOLCS reported an ash emission from Kanlaon that lasted for 30 minutes following an increase in seismic disturbances recorded earlier in the month.

On October 24, 2025, PHIVOLCS reported a short-lived, moderately explosive eruption from Kanlaon. Minor ashfall was documented in La Castellana and La Carlota.

In 2026, explosive eruptions occurred on February 19, February 26, and March 15.

On March 15, 2026, a moderately explosive eruption was recorded at Kanlaon. PHIVOLCS reported that the eruption produced an ash column reaching approximately 2 km (1.2 mi)above the vent, with ash drifting to the southwest.

On July 9, 2026, another moderately explosive eruption occurred in Kanlaon, generating ash that reached as far as Cebu. A further eruption occurred on October 10, 2026.

=== Eruption summary ===
Summary of confirmed eruptions since 1866
Start Date	End Date	VEI	Comment
October 19, 2024		2	Continuing activity since
June 3, 2024	June 3, 2024	3	
December 9, 2017	December 9, 2017	2	
November 24, 2015	June 18, 2016	2	
June 3, 2006	July 25, 2006	2	Eruption column 2 km (1.2 mi) high
January 25, 2005	May 25, 2005	2	
March 7, 2003	July 23, 2003	1	
November 28, 2002	November 28, 2002	2	
August 10, 1996	August 10, 1996	2	Eruption column 1.5 km (0.93 mi) high
August 25, 1993	September 3, 1993	2	
June 10, 1992	June 10, 1992	2	
January 8, 1992	January 8, 1992	1	
February 14, 1991	February 14, 1991	2	
October 25, 1989	December 13, 1989	2	Finish date uncertain
June 21, 1988	July 2, 1988	1	
March 30, 1987	July 2, 1987	1	Start date uncertain
June 3, 1986	18 August 1986	2	Eruption column 4 km (2.5 mi) high
October 5, 1985	December 7, 1985	1	
March 13, 1985	March 14, 1985	1	
August 8, 1980	-	2	
June 27, 1978	September 2, 1978	2	Eruption column 1.8 km (1.1 mi) high
June 5, 1970	August 24, 1970	1	
October 10, 1969	October 29, 1969	2	Eruption column 6 km (3.7 mi) high, lahars
16 December 1932	16 January 1933	2	Both dates ± 15 days
March 20, 1927	-	2	
November 6, 1905	January 16, 1906	2	Finish date uncertain
July 2, 1904	-	2	± 182 days
January 31, 1902	-	2	Strombolian eruption with lava flow
May 16, 1894	June 16, 1894	2	± 15 days both dates
July 16, 1893	-	2	± 15 days
July 2, 1866	-	2	± 182 days

== Hazard ==
The recent volcanic activity of Kanlaon has frequent phreatic and phreatomagmatic eruptions, rarely a Strombolian eruption, and rarely explosive sub- Plinian eruptions emplacing pyroclastic flows on the south-western flank of the volcano. This south-western flank was also the location of the largest known debris flow in the Philippines called the La Castellana debris avalanche. It occurred within the last 400,000 years, is 13 km^{3} (3.1 cu mi) in volume and travelled over 33 km (21 mi), covering an area of over 300 km^{2} (120 sq mi).

=== Monitoring ===
==== Alert levels ====
Kanlaon Volcano Alert Level Scheme
Alert Level	Criteria	Interpretation/Recommendation
0 (Quiet or No Alert)	All monitored parameters within background levels. Unremarkable level of volcanic earthquakes occurring within the volcano area.	Quiescence; no magmatic eruption is foreseen. However, there are perennial hazards (sudden explosions, rockfalls and landslides) within the four (4) kilometer-radius Permanent Danger Zone (PDZ) that may occur suddenly and without warning.
1 (Low-level of Volcanic Unrest)	Slight increase in volcanic earthquake and steam/gas activity. Sporadic explosions from the summit crater or new vents. Notable increase in the temperature, acidity and volcanic gas concentrations of monitored springs and fumaroles. Slight inflation or swelling of the edifice.	Hydrothermal, magmatic, or tectonic disturbances may be underway. The source of activity may be shallow, near the summit crater or in the vicinity of the edifice. Entry into the PDZ must be prohibited.
2 (Moderate Level of Volcanic Unrest)	Elevated levels of any of the following parameters: volcanic earthquake, temperature, acidity and volcanic gas concentrations of monitored springs and fumaroles, steam and ash explosions from the summit crater or new vents, inflation or swelling of the edifice.	Probable intrusion of magma at depth, which may or may not lead to magmatic eruption. Entry within PDZ must be prohibited.
3 (High Level of Volcanic Unrest)	Sustained increases in the levels of volcanic earthquakes, some may be perceptible. Occurrence of low-frequency earthquakes, volcanic tremor, rumbling sounds. Forceful and voluminous steam/ash ejections. Sustained increases in SO2 emission rates, ground deformation/swelling of the edifice. Activity at the summit may involve dome growth and/or lava flow, resultant rockfall.	Magmatic intrusion to shallow levels of the edifice is driving unrest, with indications that hazardous eruption could occur in weeks. Danger zones may be expanded to a radius of six (6) kilometers from the summit crater or active vent.
4 (Hazardous eruption imminent)	Intensifying unrest characterized by earthquake swarms and volcanic tremor, many of which may be perceptible. Frequent strong ash explosions. Increasing rates of ground deformation and swelling of the edifice. Increasing rates of lava extrusion with increased frequency and volume of rockfall and volcanic gas flux, or abrupt decrease in volcanic gas flux due to plugging of lava at the summit crater or active vent.	Low-level magmatic eruption underway, which can progress to highly hazardous major eruption within hours or days. Danger zones may be expanded to a radius of ten (10) kilometers or more from the summit crater or active vent.
5 (Hazardous eruption in progress)	Magmatic eruption characterized by explosive production of tall ash-laden eruption columns, and/or descent and frequent failure of voluminous lava flows. Generation of deadly pyroclastic flows, surges and/or lateral blasts and widespread tephra fall (ashfall). Lahars generate along river channels.	Life-threatening major eruption producing volcanic hazards that endanger communities. Danger zones may be expanded to fourteen (14) kilometers as eruption progresses.

==== Stand-down procedures ====
In order to minimize unnecessary changes in declaration of Alert Levels, the following periods shall be observed:

- From Alert Level 5 → 4: Wait at least 24 hours after hazardous activity stops.
- From Alert Level 4 → 3 or 2: Wait at least 2 weeks after activity drops below Level 4.
- From Alert Level 3 → 2: Wait 2 weeks after activity drops below Level 3.

== Hiking ==
The volcano is a favorite spot for mountain climbers and is the centerpiece of Mount Kanlaon Natural Park, a national park originally established on August 8, 1934.

The hiking trails usually start in the center of Barangay Guintubdan. Locals work with several European institutions to introduce the pioneering Unified Hiking Marker System as the first inland tourist location in the Philippines. The system is unified across a number of countries. This makes the mountain more attractive for tourists in an ecologically responsible way.

=== Trails and markers ===
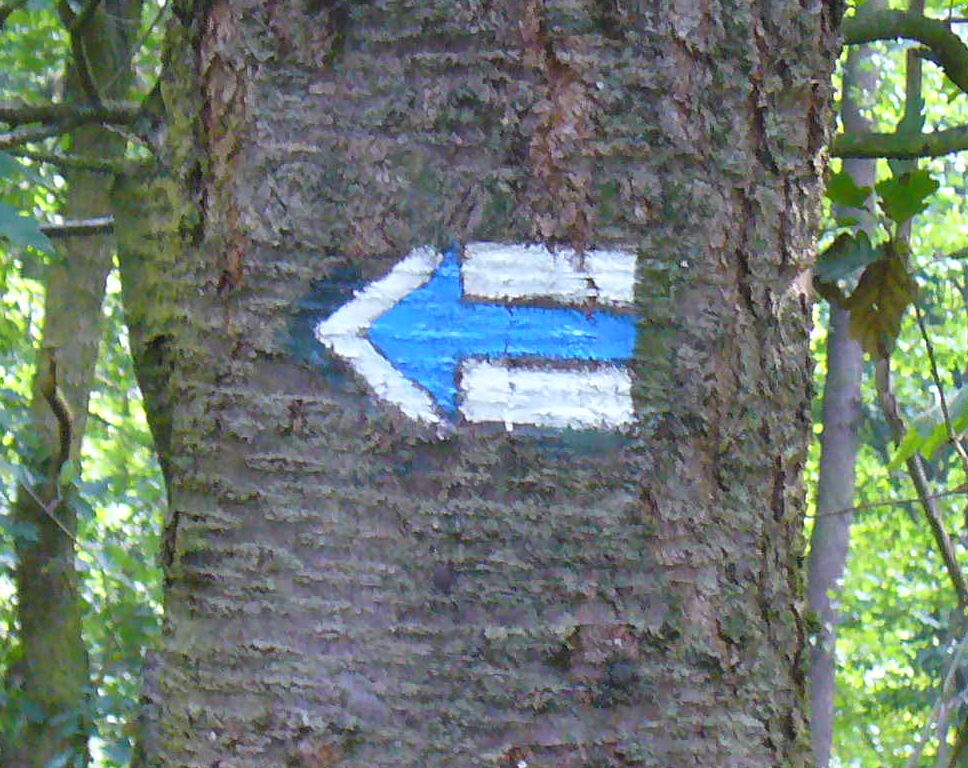
Left Turn Marker on a blue trail – marker showing the change of direction of the trail

In 2016, the first three hiking trails were marked, with additional and more extensive trails added in 2017 from the center of Guintubdan including a trail to the top. These were implemented by Mendel University, in cooperation with the University of St. La Salle and the Department of Environment and Natural Resources. The project was financed by the Czech Embassy in Manila under the Czech Aid Development program. Three color-coded trails using the colors of the Philippine flag were opened:

- Red Trail from Guintubdan to Buslugan Falls (marked in 2016)
- Yellow Trail from Guintubdan to Oro Falls (marked in 2016)
- Blue Trail from Guintubdan to Salas Park new Pavilion (marked in 2016)
- Red Trail from Guintubdan to Mt. Kanlaon Summit (marked in 2017)
- Adventure Trail and additional new trails (marked in 2017)

This system uses three bars – usually one color in between two white bars, with different meanings attached to different colors: red indicates the most difficult or summit trails, blue for difficult trails and yellow and green for easy or interconnecting trails. These marks may be posted on wooden boards or metallic plates. Basic trail markers are square, 10x10 cm in size. The volunteers marking these trails usually prepare sheet metal or cardboard matrices to keep the signs uniform in size. Any change of direction is marked with arrows of the same color and similar design.

== Mythology ==
In the Indigenous Philippine folk religions, specifically the anito belief systems of the various Visayan peoples, Mount Kanlaon is regarded as the domain of a powerful female deity named Laon (meaning "the ancient one") who was also regarded as the supreme creator deity of most Visayan groups. "Kan" is a prefix meaning "belonging to", hence Kanlaon means "belongs to Laon". Laon is present in the pre-colonial beliefs of the Aklanon, Capiznon, Cebuano, Hiligaynon, Karay-a, Suludnon, and Waray people, among others.

The belief systems surrounding Laon, known for time immemorial among the locals, was first recorded by Western colonizers as "Lalahon" or "Lahon" by the conquistador Miguel de Loarca in Relación de las Yslas Filipinas (1582). De Loarca records that Lalahon was an agricultural deity invoked by the natives for good harvests. When she was displeased, she would send locusts to spoil the crops. De Loarca specifically mentions that she dwells in the Kanlaon volcano.

== Legacy in Astrogeology ==
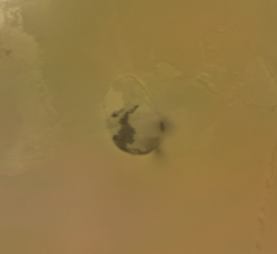
An image of Kanlaon Patera on the moon Io, taken from space.

On April 10, 2023, an active volcano on Io, the third-largest moon of the planet Jupiter, was named Kanlaon Patera by the International Astronomical Union (IAU), in accordance with the naming convention that volcanoes on Io should be named after gods and goddesses from mythology associated with fire, volcanoes, the Sun, lightning, or blacksmithing. During the pre-colonial era, the goddess Kan-Laon was believed to dwell atop Mount Kanlaon, associating her with volcanoes.

== See also ==
- List of volcanoes in the Philippines
  - List of active volcanoes in the Philippines
  - List of potentially active volcanoes in the Philippines
  - List of inactive volcanoes in the Philippines
- List of protected areas of the Philippines
