= Conlephasma =

Conlephasma enigma

Scientific classification
- Kingdom: Animalia
- Phylum: Arthropoda
- Class: Insecta
- Order: Phasmatodea
- Family: Lonchodidae
- Genus: Conlephasma; Gottardo & Heller, 2012
- Species: C. enigma

Binomial name
- Conlephasma enigma Gottardo & Heller, 2012

Genus of stick insects

Conlephasma enigma is a wingless, ground-dwelling species of stick insect in the monotypic genus Conlephasma, and is found on Mount Halcon, on the Philippine island of Mindoro.

The species is brightly coloured, with males having a dark bluish-green head and legs, and a bright orange body with bluish-black triangle-shaped spots on the back. Females are less brightly coloured. It sprays a foul-smelling liquid, from glands behind its head, to repel predators.

The species was identified when entomologist Oskar Conle showed Marco Gottardo and Philipp Heller specimens which had been collected some years earlier. They identified it as new to science and allocated it to a new genus in a paper published in Comptes Rendus Biologies.
