= Mount Matutum =

Volcano on the island of Mindanao, Philippines

Matutum
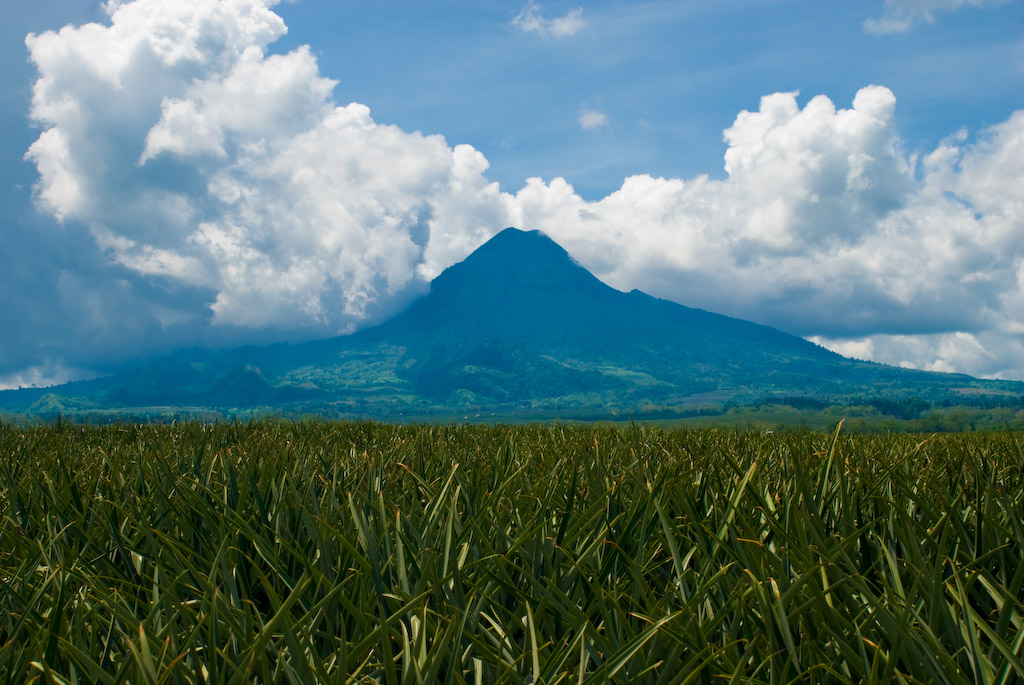
- The majestic Mount Matutum viewed from Tupi, South Cotabato

Highest point
- Elevation: 2,286 m (7,500 ft)
- Prominence: 1,950 m (6,400 ft)
- Listing: Active volcano; Ultra; Ribu
- Coordinates: 6°26′00″N 125°06′30″E

Geography
- Location within Mindanao mainland Location within Philippines
- Country: Philippines
- Region: Soccsksargen
- Province: South Cotabato
- City/municipality: Tupi
- Parent range: Hamiguitan Mountain Range

Geology
- Mountain type: Stratovolcano
- Volcanic arc: Cotabato Arc
- Last eruption: 1911 (Unconfirmed)

Mount Matutum is an active stratovolcano, and is the highest point in the province of South Cotabato in the Philippines, with an elevation of 7,500 feet (2,286 metres) above sea level, approximately 5.7 kilometres (3.5 mi) from Acmonan, Tupi, South Cotabato. Matutum and its foothills are predominantly inhabited by the indigenous Blaan families.

Its slopes are forested and host diverse species of plants and animals, including such endangered species as the Philippine eagle and the tarsier.

== Location ==
Matutum is located in the province of South Cotabato, on the island of Mindanao, in the south of the Philippines, at geographical coordinates 6°22'N, 125°06.5'E.

It is 15 kilometres (9.3 mi) north of Polomolok, and about 30 kilometres (19 mi) north-northwest of General Santos.

== Physical features ==
Matutum is a stratovolcano that rises 2,286 metres (7,500 ft) asl with a base diameter of 25 kilometres (16 mi).

It has two hot springs, called Acmonan and Linan, 5.7 kilometres (3.5 mi) west-southwest of the volcano.

Adjacent volcanic edifices are Landayao, Tampad, and Albulhek, which are all west of the volcano, and Magolo to the north.

There is a well-preserved 320-metre (1,050 ft) wide crater at the volcano's summit. The crater is breached by three gorges and has a 120-metre (390 ft) deep, densely forested floor.

== Eruptions ==
Volcanologists suspect that Matutum may have had a phreatic eruption on March 7, 1911.

Matutum is one of the active volcanoes in the Philippines. All are part of the Pacific ring of fire.

== See also ==
- List of volcanoes in the Philippines
  - List of active volcanoes in the Philippines
  - List of potentially active volcanoes in the Philippines
  - List of inactive volcanoes in the Philippines
- Philippine Institute of Volcanology and Seismology
