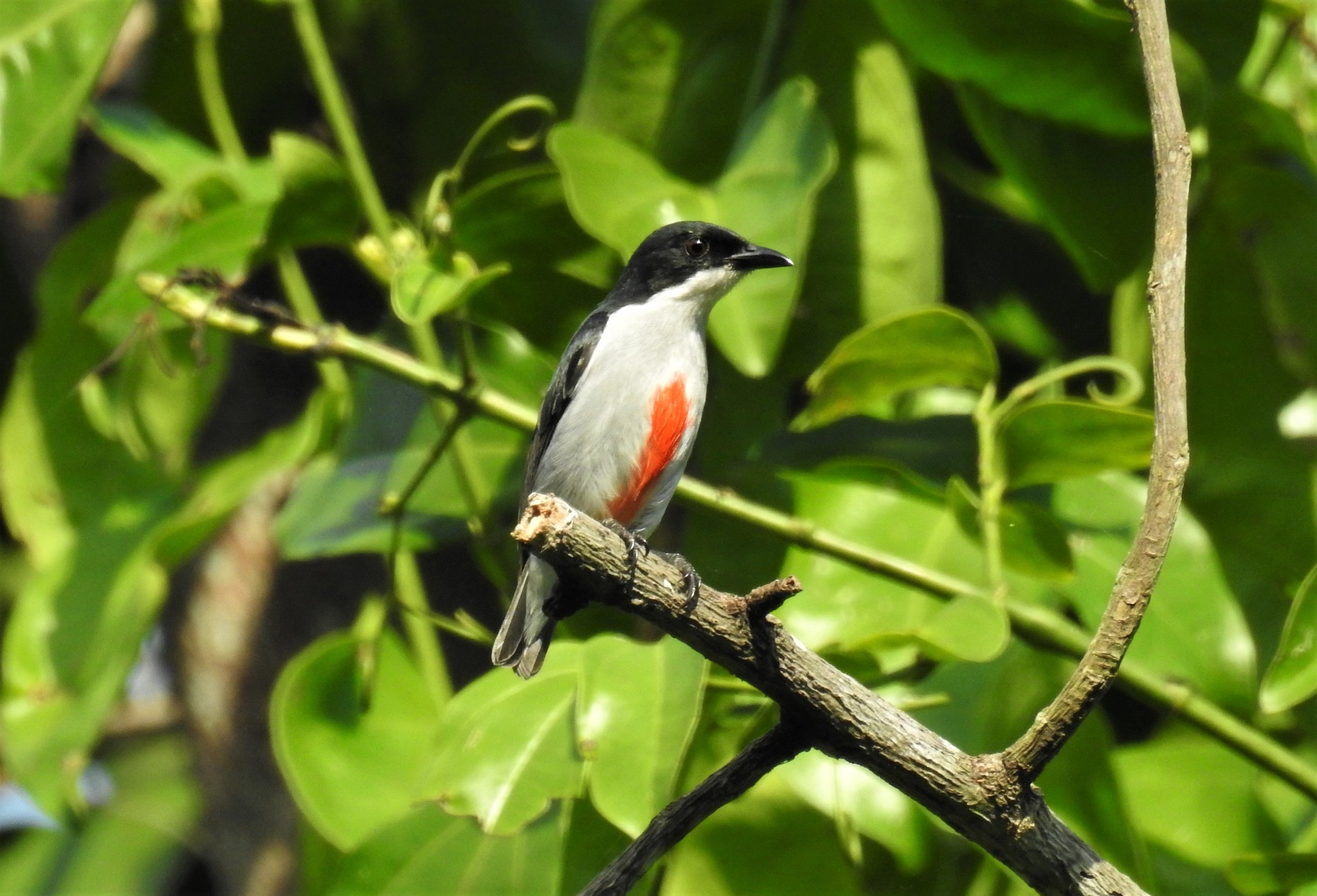

Conservation status
- Least Concern (IUCN 3.1)

Scientific classification
- Kingdom: Animalia
- Phylum: Chordata
- Class: Aves
- Order: Passeriformes
- Family: Dicaeidae
- Genus: Dicaeum
- Species: D. australe

Binomial name
- Dicaeum australe (Hermann, 1783)

= Red-keeled flowerpecker =

Species of bird

The red-keeled flowerpecker or red-striped flowerpecker (Dicaeum australe) is a species of bird in the family Dicaeidae. It is endemic to the Philippines. It is one of the more common birds in the Philippines as it is able to thrive in a wide array of habitats. The black-belted flowerpecker (D. haematostictum) was formerly regarded as a subspecies of this bird.

== Description and taxonomy ==
Small, relatively long curved bill of medium thickness, sexes similar, races vary by having black breast and broad scarlet keel haematostictum or no black and narrow scarlet keel australe male upperparts glossy blue black; chin and sides of throat white; rest of underparts gray with diagnostic narrow scarlet stripe down center of the breast and belly; underwing and pectoral tufts white. female like male but paler. imm dark grayish brown above, brownish olive gray below. Bill and lags black; eye dark chestnut.

The Black-belted flowerpecker was once considered a subspecies of Red-keeled flowerpecker but has since been classified as a separate species

== Ecology and behavior ==
Feeds on small fruits, mistletoes, flowers and also takes small insects. Forages mostly in the canopy and middle stratum. Found singly, in pairs or mixed species flocks with other flowerpeckers and small birds. Breeding has been observed from April to August but . Relative to how common this species is, not much is actually known about this bird's biology.

== Habitat and conservation status ==
This species is extremely adaptable to almost any habitat except montane forest, found in lowland forest, second growth, agricultural areas and parks. The IUCN has classified the species as least concern as it is common throughout its wide range. Its adaptability to be able to thrive in degraded habitat has made one of the few Philippine endemic birds that does not have a declining population.
