= Mount Sicapoo =

Mountain in Luzon, Philippines

- Location within Luzon Location within Philippines

Highest point
- Elevation: 2,361 m (7,746 ft)
- Prominence: 1,581 m (5,187 ft)
- Listing: Philippines highest peaks; 33rd; Philippines ultra peaks 26th; Ribu; Ilocos Norte highest point
- Coordinates: 18°00′47″N 120°56′21″E

Geography
- Country: Philippines
- Region: Ilocos Region; Cordillera Administrative Region
- Provinces: Ilocos Norte; Abra

Mount Sicapoo (sā-kā-pöö) is a mountain in the Cordillera Central of Ilocos Norte and Abra, Luzon, Philippines. It is the highest point in Ilocos Norte. Located to the south of Mount Kilang, to the southeast of Laoag and to the east of the Padsan River. The mountain is heavily forested with pine trees. Its highest point is 7,746 feet (2,361 m) above sea level.

Ascents of the mountain begin at the Gasgas River in nearby Solsona and initially lead to the campsite at Saulay, before moving to Bubuos and Pakpako campsites. Due to its steep cliffs in places, particularly approaching the summit, it is considered highly treacherous and exceptionally difficult to climb. Sicapoo was not fully ascended until 2009.

In October 2016, when Typhoon Haima broke out, the mountain played a role in diminishing its power as it headed towards China, though it remained a Category 1 Typhoon.

== See also ==
- List of ultras of the Philippines
