= Mount Ragang =

Active volcano in the Philippines

- Mount Piapayungan
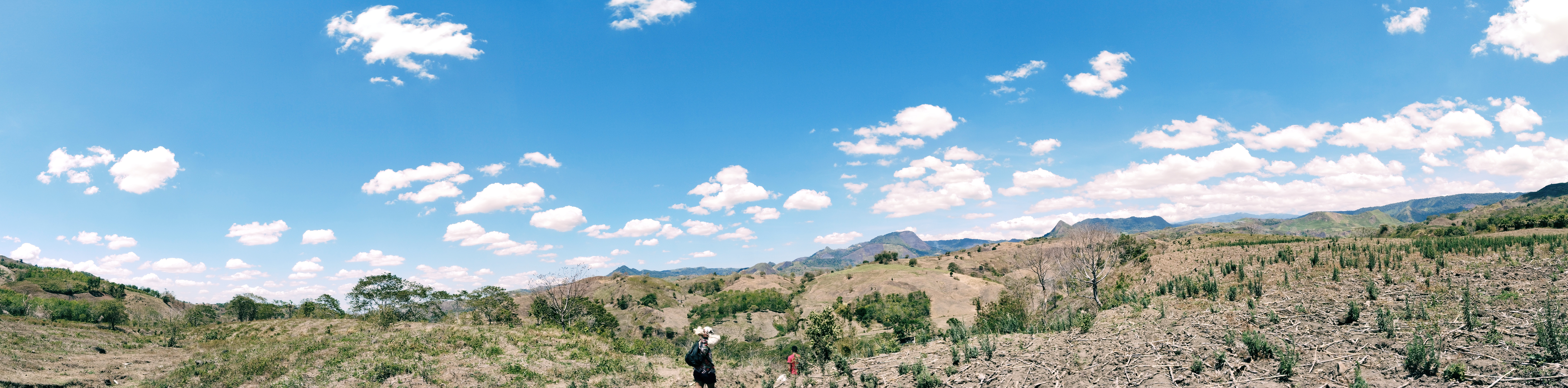
- Panoramic view of Mount Ragang

Highest point
- Elevation: 2,815 m (9,236 ft)
- Prominence: 1,590 m (5,220 ft)
- Listing: Active volcano; Ultra; Ribu
- Coordinates: 7°41′40″N 124°30′27″E

Geography
- Location within Philippines
- Location: Mindanao
- Country: Philippines
- Regions: Bangsamoro; Soccsksargen
- Province: Lanao del Sur
- Parent range: Piapayungan Range

Geology
- Mountain type: Stratovolcano
- Last eruption: July 1916

Mount Ragang, also called Mount Piagayungan and Blue Mountain by the local people, is an active stratovolcano on Mindanao island in the Philippines. With an elevation of 2,815 metres (9,236 ft), it is the seventh highest mountain in the Philippines and the highest point in the Lanao del Sur province.

== Location ==
Mount Ragang is located in the southern part of Lanao del Sur in the Bangsamoro autonomous region.

== Physical features ==
Ragang has an elevation of 2,815 metres (9,236 ft) and a base diameter of 32 km (20 mi).

It is the most active volcano on Mindanao, and is part of a string of volcanoes in what volcanologists call the Central Mindanao Arc. It is one of the active volcanoes in the Philippines, which are all part of the Pacific ring of fire.

== Eruptions ==
There is still some confusion on the number of times Ragang has erupted. The Philippine Institute of Volcanology and Seismology lists eight eruptions, with the last one occurring in July 1916. However, the Smithsonian Institution's Global Volcanology Programs, citing the Catalog of Active Volcanoes of the World (Neumann van Padang, 1953), suggests that some eruptions attributed to nearby Makaturing were those of Ragang.

== See also ==
- List of mountains in the Philippines
- List of ultras of the Philippines
- List of Southeast Asian mountains
- List of volcanoes in the Philippines
  - List of active volcanoes in the Philippines
  - List of potentially active volcanoes in the Philippines
  - List of inactive volcanoes in the Philippines
- Philippine Institute of Volcanology and Seismology
