= Mount Pulag =

Volcano in Luzon, Philippines

- Bundok Pulag (Filipino); Bantay Pulag (Ilocano)
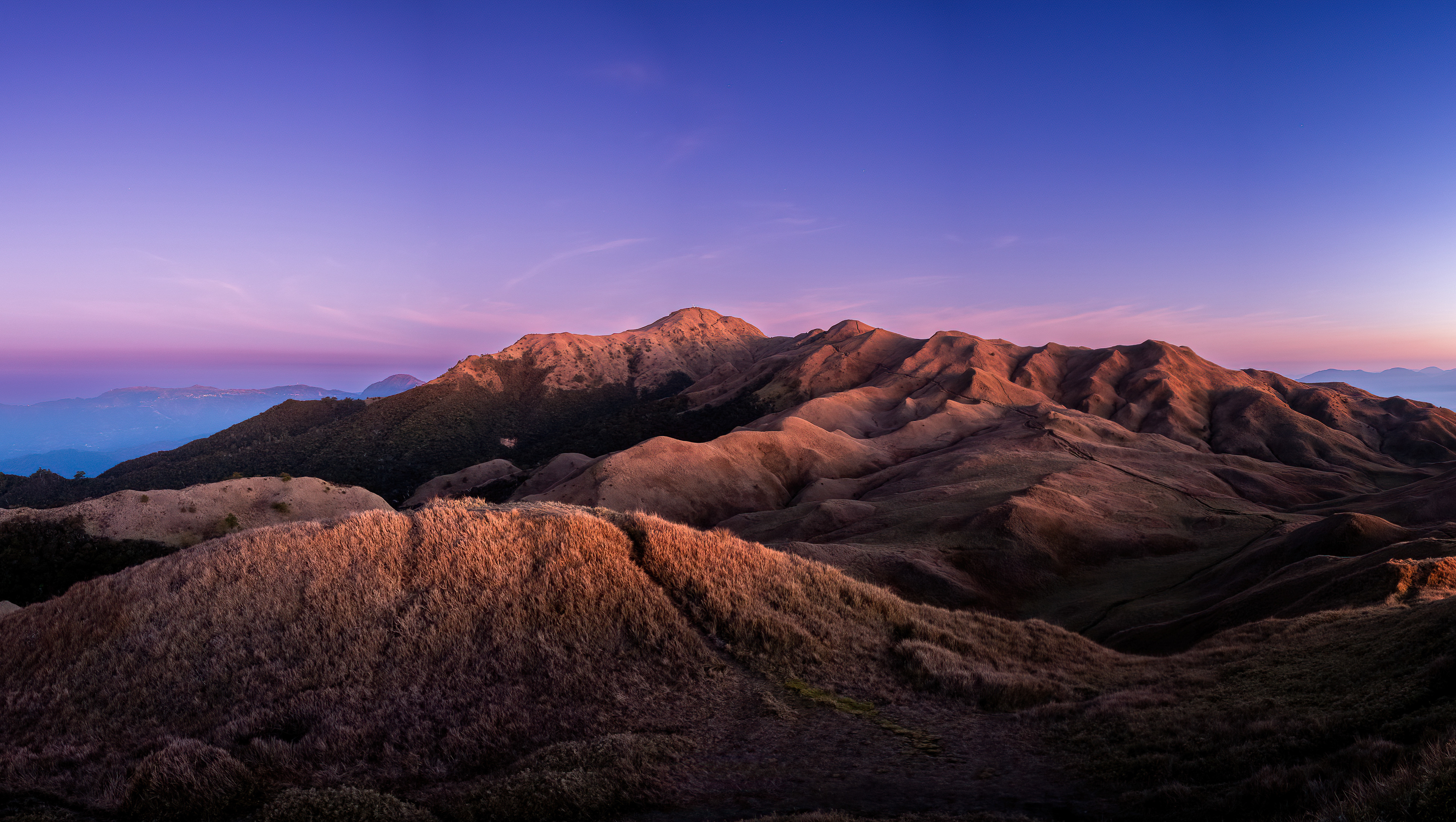
- Panoramic shot of Mount Pulag summit

Highest point
- Elevation: 2,928 m (9,606 ft)
- Prominence: 2,928 m (9,606 ft); Ranked 107th
- Listing: World most prominent peaks 107th Island highest point 26th Philippines high peaks 3rd Philippines Ultra peaks 2nd Philippines Ribu peaks 2nd Luzon highest peak
- Coordinates: 16°35′0.86″N 120°53′0.93″E

Geography
- Location within Luzon Location within Philippines
- Location: Luzon
- Country: Philippines
- Regions: Cordillera Administrative Region and Cagayan Valley
- Provinces: Benguet, Ifugao and Nueva Vizcaya
- Municipalities: Bokod, Kabayan, Kayapa and Tinoc
- Parent range: Cordillera Central

Geology
- Mountain type: Dormant volcano
- Volcanic arc: Luzon Volcanic Arc

Climbing
- First ascent: c. 2000 BC by the native Ibalois.
- Easiest route: Ambangeg Trail

Mount Pulag (Filipino: Bundok Pulag; Ilocano: Bantay Pulag) is Luzon's highest peak at 2,928 metres (9,606 ft) above sea level, third-highest mountain in the Philippines, and the 26th-highest peak of an island on Earth.

It is second-most prominent mountain in the Philippines. Located on the triple border of the provinces of Benguet, Ifugao, and Nueva Vizcaya, the borders meet at the mountain's peak. Mount Pulag is third highest next to Mount Apo and Mount Dulang-dulang.

Mount Pulag is famous for its "sea of clouds" and its exceptional view of the Milky Way Galaxy at dawn, which had "other-worldly" scenery.

The entire mountain is believed to be the home to the tinmongao spirits and is the sacred resting ground of the souls of the Ibaloi people and other ethnic peoples in the area.

== History ==
The Ibaloi people of Benguet mummify their dead and house them in caverns in the mountain. The Kabayan mummy burial caves, one of the main attraction of the site, are considered Philippine national cultural treasures under Presidential Decree No. 432.

Mt. Pulag was proclaimed a national park through Presidential Proclamation No. 75 signed by President Corazon Aquino on February 20, 1987, covering an area of 11,550 hectares (28,500 acres). It is part of the Cordillera Biogeographic Zone and is a National Integrated Protected Areas Programme (NIPAP) site.

The national park is inhabited by different ethnic groups such as the Ibalois, Kalanguya, Kankana-eys, Karao, and Ifugaos.

== Geography ==
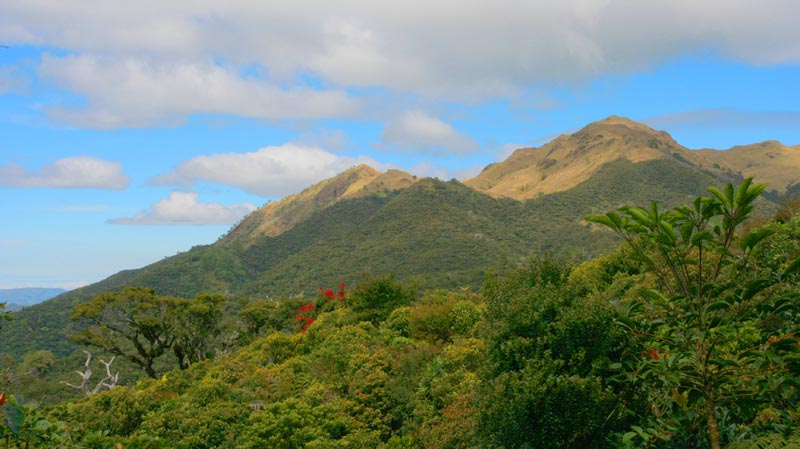
Mount Pulag

Mount Pulag stands at 2,928 metres (9,606 ft) high. The peak of the mountain is located in the Municipality of Kabayan Province of Benguet.

=== Climate ===
The climate at the summit of Mount Pulag is subpolar oceanic (Köppen Cwc), bordering a subtropical highland (Köppen Cwb) climate, as its summer mean temperatures only slightly exceed 10 degrees Celsius. Rainfall on the mountain averages 4,489 millimetres (176.7 in) yearly with August being the wettest month with an average rainfall of 1,135 millimetres (44.7 in).

Snow has never fallen on its top, as snow is impossible due to lack of elevation and subzero temperatures. However, there are hailstorms that look like snow. Frost is common on the mountain due to the low temperature during those months.

During the winter season, the temperature at the highest point of the mountain is known to dip into sub-freezing temperatures, making it the coldest place in the country. There is no recorded instance of snow here.

Climate data for Mount Pulag
Month	Jan	Feb	Mar	Apr	May	Jun	Jul	Aug	Sep	Oct	Nov	Dec	Year
Mean daily maximum °C (°F)	9.3 (48.7)	10.3 (50.5)	12.3 (54.1)	13.3 (55.9)	13.3 (55.9)	12.3 (54.1)	12.3 (54.1)	11.3 (52.3)	12.3 (54.1)	12.3 (54.1)	11.3 (52.3)	9.3 (48.7)	11.6 (52.9)
Daily mean °C (°F)	5.8 (42.4)	6.8 (44.2)	8.3 (46.9)	9.8 (49.6)	10.3 (50.5)	9.8 (49.6)	10.3 (50.5)	9.3 (48.7)	9.8 (49.6)	8.8 (47.8)	7.8 (46.0)	6.3 (43.3)	8.6 (47.4)
Mean daily minimum °C (°F)	2.3 (36.1)	3.3 (37.9)	4.3 (39.7)	6.3 (43.3)	7.3 (45.1)	7.3 (45.1)	7.3 (45.1)	7.3 (45.1)	7.3 (45.1)	5.3 (41.5)	4.3 (39.7)	3.3 (37.9)	5.5 (41.8)
Average precipitation mm (inches)	38 (1.5)	57 (2.2)	77 (3.0)	141 (5.6)	390 (15.4)	355 (14.0)	426 (16.8)	441 (17.4)	426 (16.8)	259 (10.2)	97 (3.8)	57 (2.2)	2,764 (108.9)
Source: meteoblue.com

=== Fauna and flora ===
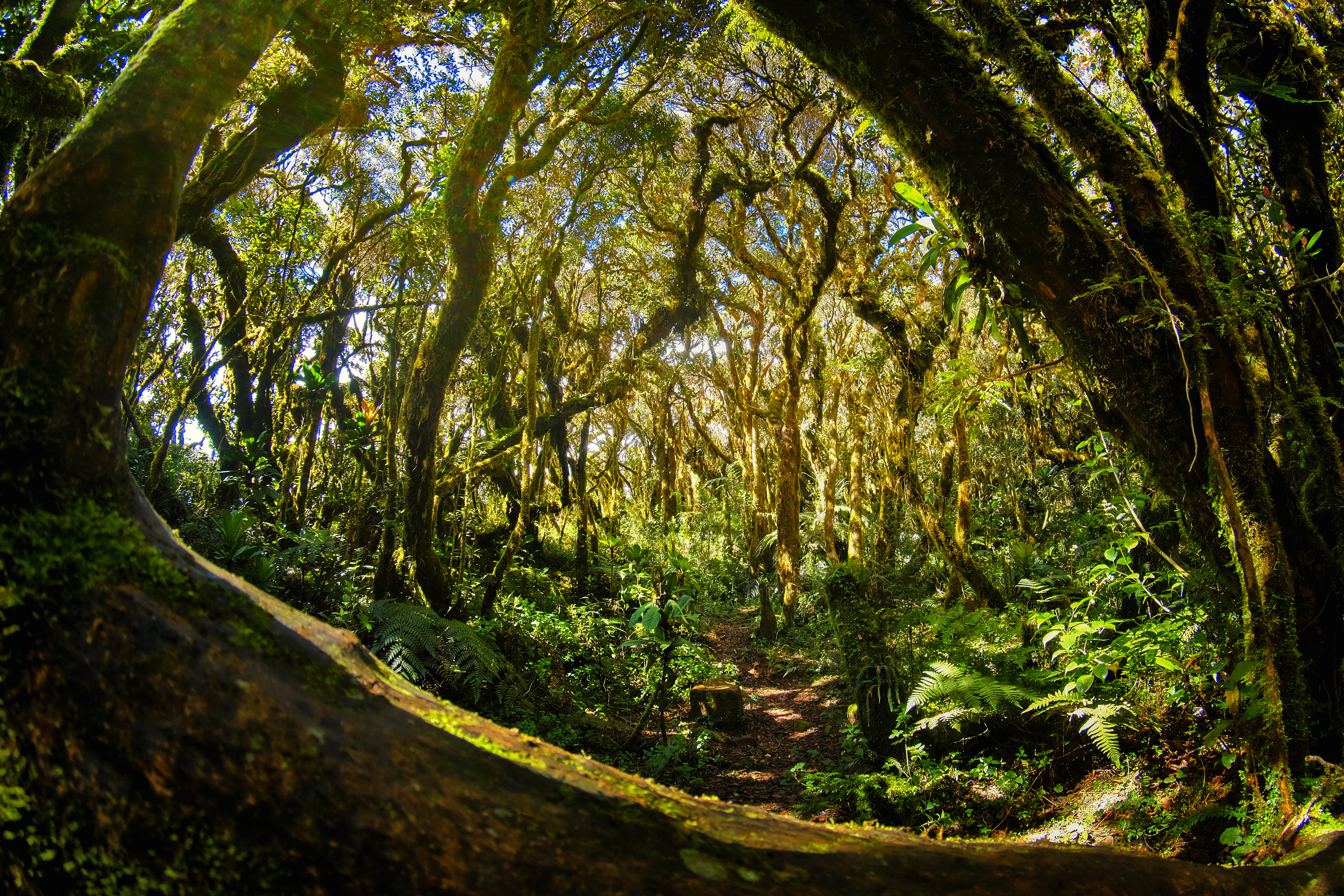
Mossy forest of Mount Pulag

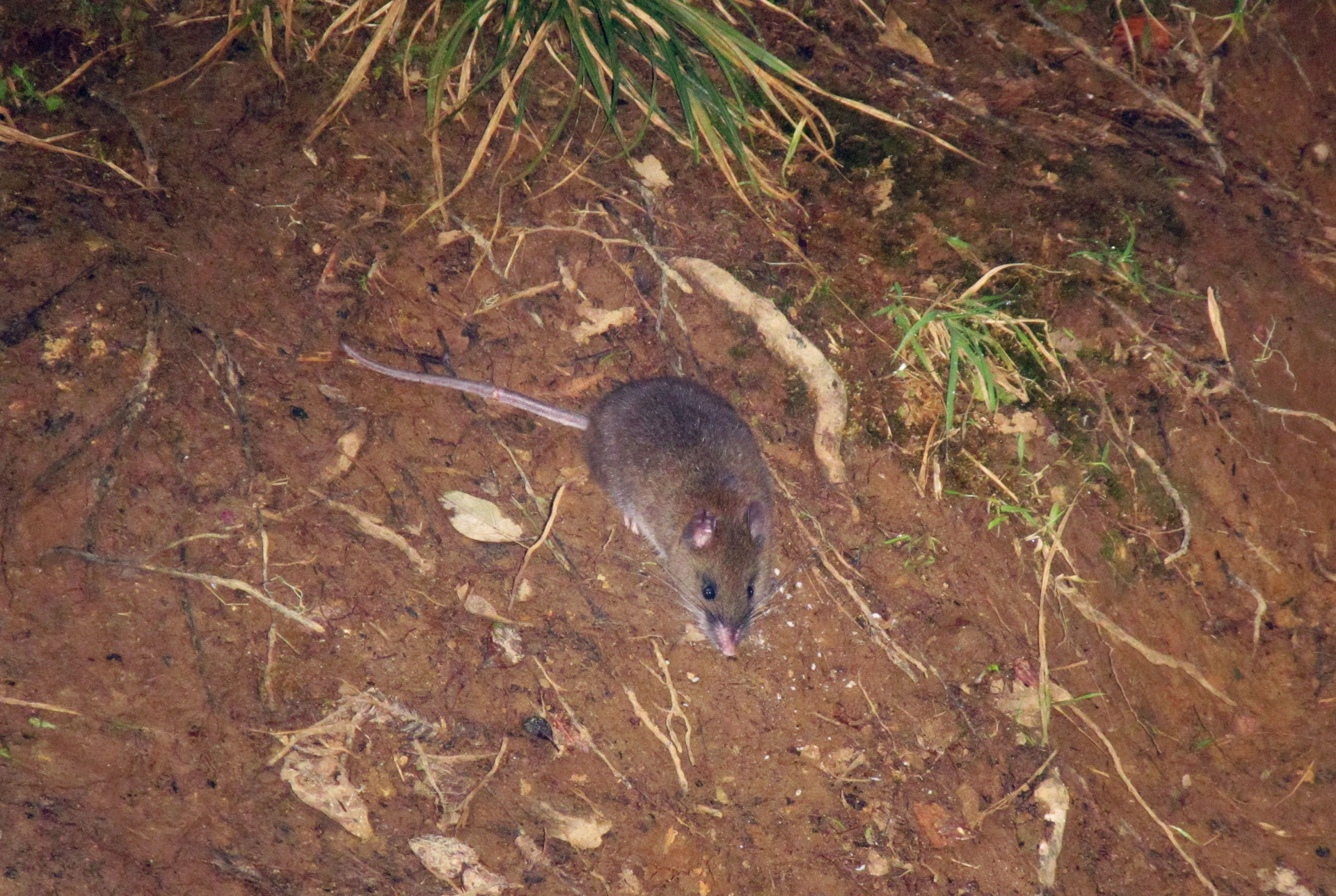
A short-footed Luzon Tree Rat or a Dwarf Cloud Rat

Mount Pulag has a large diversity of flora and fauna, including many species that are endemic to the mountain. Mount Pulag hosts 528 documented plant species. It is the natural habitat of the dwarf bamboo (Yushania niitakayamensis) and the Benguet pine (Pinus kesiya) that dominate the areas of Luzon tropical pine forests found on the mountainsides. From the 1950s to the early 1970s the more accessible tracts of Benguet pine were felled. The Philippine yew tree, which contains a compound associated with cancer treatment, is found on Mount Pulag. Its bark is used by indigenous Ibaloi and Kalanguya communities to make tea.

At lower elevations, Mount Pulag has a mossy forest full of ferns, lichens, and moss.

Among its native wildlife are 33 bird species and several threatened mammals such as the Philippine deer, giant bushy-tailed cloud rat (bowet) and the long-haired fruit bat. Mount Pulag is the only place that hosts the four cloud rat species. It is one of the most biodiverse locations in the Philippines, with the newly found (since 1896) 185-grams dwarf cloud rat, Carpomys melanurus, a rare breed (endemic to the Cordillera), and the Koch pitta bird among its endangered denizens.

== Conservation efforts ==
In April 2022, President Rodrigo Duterte signed a law declaring Mount Pulag as a protected landscape under the National Integrated Protected Areas System.

== Hiking activity ==
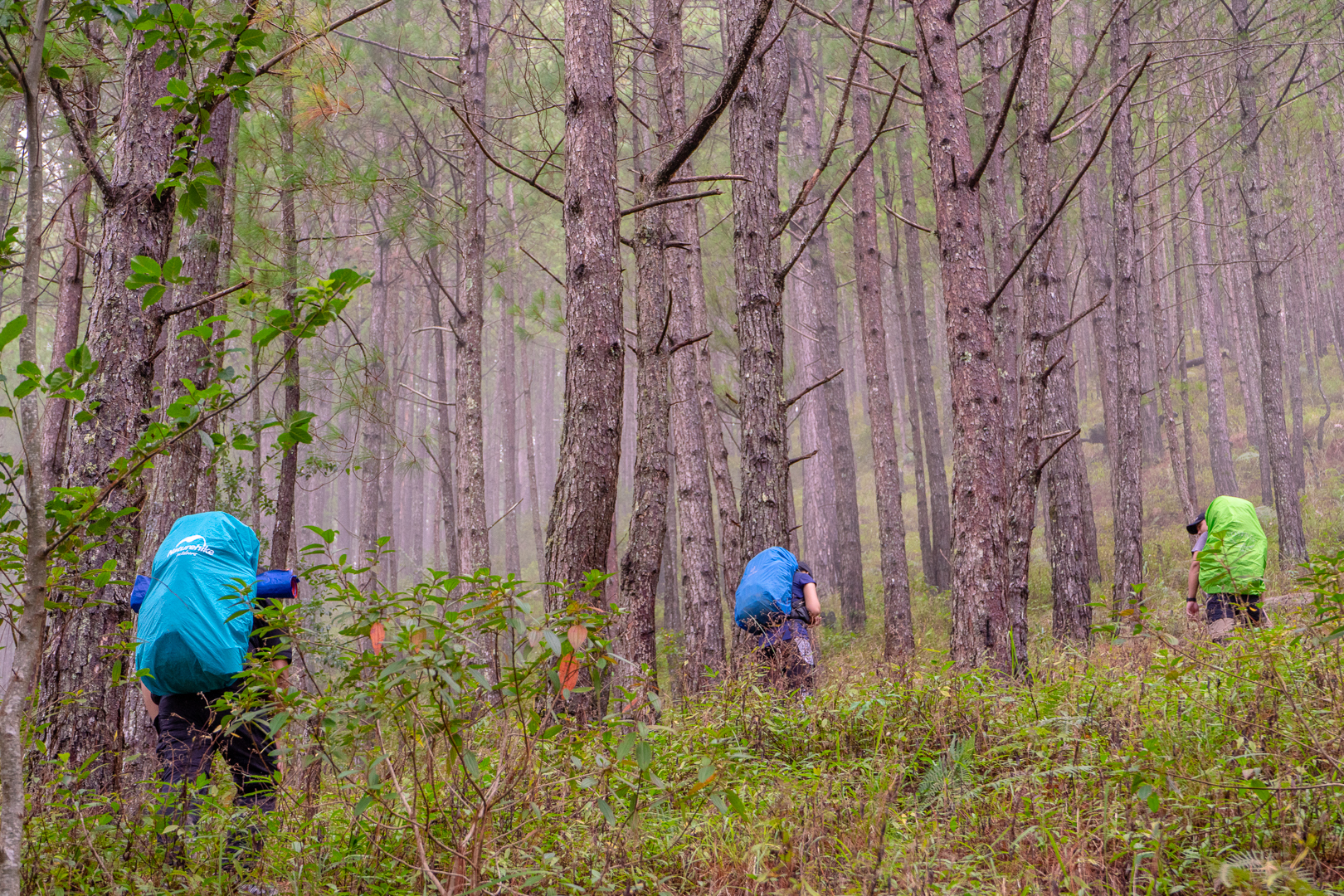
Akiki Trail of Mt. Pulag

As the highest mountain in Luzon, Mount Pulag attracts a lot of mountain climbers. Highlights of the climb include the montane forests and the grassland summit with its "sea of clouds" phenomenon. There are four major trails up the summit: the Ambangeg, Akiki, and Tawangan trails from Benguet and the Ambaguio trail from Nueva Vizcaya. These trails are managed by the Mount Pulag National Park, under the Department of Environment and Natural Resources.

== Incidents ==
=== Presidential helicopter crash ===
On April 7, 2009, a Philippine Air Force (PAF) Bell 412 of the 250th Presidential Airlift Wing crashed at 6,900 feet (2,100 m) above sea level in the Kabayan-Pulag pass between Mount Mangingihi and Mount Pulag in thick low cloud and fog. The pilots and their passengers, who were presidential appointees, died in the crash.

=== January 2018 forest fire ===
On January 20, 2018, the Mount Pulag National Park temporarily suspended trekking and hiking activities on Mount Pulag following a forest fire at a section of the mountain. According to an initial investigation, the fire started when a butane gas stove brought by a hiker allegedly exploded. Fire officers declared the fire extinguished later that day. Lawsuits were afterwards filed against the perpetrators of the fire. Park rangers estimated it would take at least 6 months to 1 year before the area completely recovers.

== See also ==
- List of mountains in the Philippines
- List of national parks of the Philippines
- List of Southeast Asian mountains
