= Mount Alu =

Volcano in the Philippines

- Location within Philippines

Highest point
- Elevation: 95 m (312 ft)
- Prominence: 95 m (312 ft)
- Listing: List of inactive volcanoes in the Philippines
- Coordinates: 5°41′30″N 120°52′59″E

Geography
- Location: Sulu, Philippines

Geology
- Mountain type: Stratovolcano
- Volcanic arc: Sulu Volcanic Arc
- Last eruption: c2500s BC

Mount Alu is a volcano located on the eastern tip of island town of Lugus, in the province of Sulu in the southernmost Philippines.

The Philippine Institute of Volcanology and Seismology (Phivolcs) classifies Mount Alu as Inactive.

== See also ==
- List of inactive volcanoes in the Philippines
- List of volcanoes in the Philippines
- Pacific ring of fire
- Volcano
- Sulu
- Autonomous Region in Muslim Mindanao
- Mindanao
