= List of ultras of the Philippines =

This is a list of all the ultra-prominent peaks (with topographic prominence greater than 1,500 meters) in the Philippines.

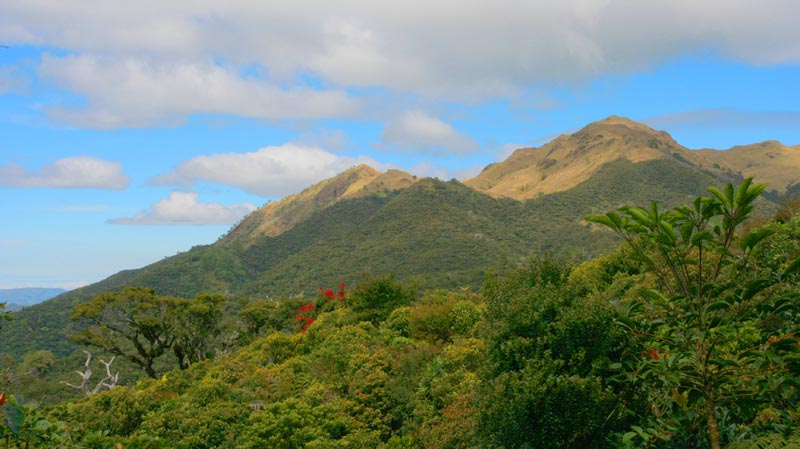
Mount Pulag

No.	Peak	Island	Province(s)	Elevation (m)	Prominence (m)	Col (m)
1	Mount Apo	Mindanao	Cotabato, Davao del Sur	2,956	2,956	0
2	Mount Pulag	Luzon	Benguet, Ifugao, Nueva Vizcaya	2,928	2,928	0
3	Mount Halcon	Mindoro	Oriental Mindoro	2,616	2,616	0
4	Mount Tagubud	Mindanao	Davao de Oro	2,670	2,580	90
5	Mayon	Luzon	Albay	2,462	2,447	15
6	Mount Dulang-dulang	Mindanao	Bukidnon	2,938	2,444	498
7	Kanlaon	Negros	Negros Occidental, Negros Oriental	2,465	2,430	0
8	Mount Malindang	Mindanao	Misamis Occidental	2,404	2,290	114
9	Mount Madja-as	Panay	Antique	2,117	2,117	0
10	Mount Mantalingajan	Palawan	Palawan	2,085	2,085	0
11	Mount Guiting-Guiting	Sibuyan	Romblon	2,050	2,050	0
12	Mount Tapulao	Luzon	Zambales	2,037	2,015	22
13	Mount Isarog	Luzon	Camarines Sur	2,000	1,951	49
14	Mount Matutum	Mindanao	South Cotabato	2,286	1,950	336
15	Mount Banahaw	Luzon	Laguna, Quezon	2,170	1,919	251
16	Mount Hilong-Hilong	Mindanao	Agusan del Norte	2,012	1,838	82
17	Mount Mangabon	Mindanao	Misamis Oriental	2,510	1,803	677
18	Mount Busa	Mindanao	South Cotabato, Sarangani	2,030	1,661	369
19	Kioto Mountains	Mindanao	Davao Oriental	1,816	1,639	177
20	Mount Mambajao	Camiguin	Camiguin	1,630	1,630	0
21	Mount Victoria	Palawan	Palawan	1,709	1,619	90
22	Mingan Mountains	Luzon	Aurora	1,901	1,601	300
23	Mount Ragang/Mount Piapayungan	Mindanao	Lanao del Sur, Cotabato	2,815	1,590	1225
24	Cleopatra's Needle	Palawan	Palawan	1,608	1,582	26
25	Mount Sicapoo	Luzon	Apayao, Ilocos Norte	2,361	1,581	780
26	Mount Baco	Mindoro	Occidental Mindoro	2,364	1,574	790
27	Mount Bulusan	Luzon	Sorsogon	1,565	1,547	18
28	Mount Labo	Luzon	Camarines Norte, Camarines Sur, Quezon	1,544	1,524	20
29	Mount Kalatungan	Mindanao	Bukidnon	2,824	1,502	

== See also ==
- List of mountains in the Philippines

== Sources ==
- List
- Map
