= Mount Atimbia =

Volcano on the island of Luzon, Philippines

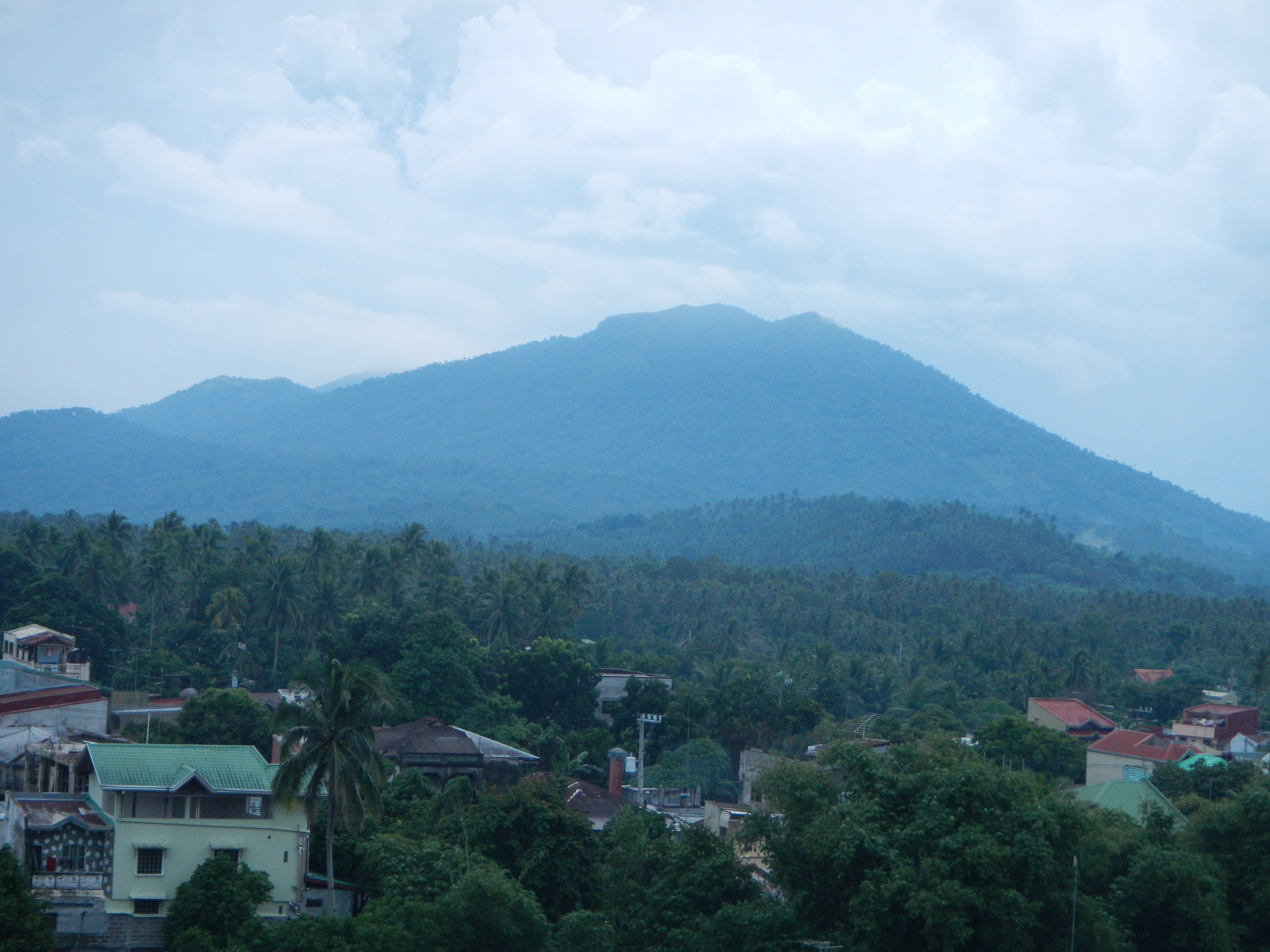

Highest point
- Elevation: 654 m (2,146 ft)
- Coordinates: 14°09′00″N 121°21′59″E

Geography
- Location: Laguna, Philippines

Geology
- Volcanic zone: Laguna Volcanic Field

Mount Atimbia is an inactive volcano in Laguna and has an elevation of 654 metres. Mount Atimbia is situated northeast of Mount Mabilog and east of Kalisungan. It is found on the Laguna Volcanic Field.
