= Mount Tagubud =

Mountain in Davao de Oro, Philippines

- Mount Pandadagsaan
- Location within Mindanao mainland Location within Philippines

Highest point
- Elevation: 2,670 m (8,760 ft)
- Prominence: 2,580 m (8,460 ft)
- Listing: Mountains in the Philippines; Ultra-prominent peak Ribu
- Coordinates: 7°26′42″N 126°13′37″E

Geography
- Country: Philippines
- Island group: Mindanao
- Region: Davao
- Province: Davao de Oro
- Municipality: New Bataan

Mount Tagubud, also known as Mount Pandadagsaan or White Peak, is the highest mountain in the province of Davao de Oro in the Philippines with an elevation of 2,670 metres (8,760 ft) above sea level. Located in New Bataan Davao de Oro, Davao Region in the island of Mindanao Philippines, Mount Tagubud is the source of the Agusan River.

== See also ==
- List of ultras of the Philippines
