= Mount Pinukis =

Inactive volcano in the Philippines

- Location within Philippines

Highest point
- Elevation: 5,026 ft (1,532 m)
- Prominence: 3,999 ft (1,219 m)
- Listing: Inactive volcanoes in the Philippines; Ribu
- Coordinates: 7°59′02″N 123°13′59″E

Geography
- Location: Mindanao
- Country: Philippines
- Region: Zamboanga Peninsula
- Province: Zamboanga del Sur
- City: Pagadian

Geology
- Mountain type: Unknown
- Last eruption: Unknown

Mount Pinukis is an inactive volcano in Brgy. Lison Valley, Pagadian, Philippines. It is the highest peak of Zamboanga del Sur and the entire Zamboanga Peninsula.

It covers more than 20,000 hectares (49,000 acres), has up to 2015 retained a relatively intact forest cover and is therefore included in the Important Bird and Biodiversity Areas (IBAs).

Pinukis, the sacred mountain of the Subanen tribe, and a main source for the water system of the three provinces of the Zamboanga peninsula, is under threat from multinational mining companies who wish to engage in open-cast mining.

== See also ==
- Midsalip
- Pagadian City
