= Mount Abunug =

Dormant volcano in the Philippines

- Location within Visayas Location within Philippines

Highest point
- Elevation: 258 m (846 ft)
- Coordinates: 11°00′00″N 124°41′00″E

Geography
- Location: Leyte Island
- Country: Philippines
- Region: Eastern Visayas
- Province: Leyte

Mount Abunug a dormant volcano in the Philippines. It is located in the province of Leyte and the Eastern Visayas region, in the south-eastern part of the country, 600 kilometres (370 mi) southeast of the national capital Manila.
