= Mount Inayawan Range Natural Park =

Protected area in Northern Mindanao, Philippines

- Mount Iniaoan Range Natural Park
- IUCN category II (national park)
- Location within Philippines
- Location: Lanao del Norte, Philippines
- Nearest city: Iligan
- Coordinates: 7°49′10″N 123°55′34″E
- Area: 3,632.74 hectares (8,976.7 acres)
- Elevation: 1,535
- Established: July 30, 2007
- Governing body: Department of Environment and Natural Resources

The Mount Inayawan Range Natural Park (also known as Mount Iniaoan Range Natural Park) is a protected area of forested mountains in the Northern Mindanao region of the Philippines. The park encompasses the Inayawan Mountain Range, also known as Iniaoan Mountain Range, located in the landlocked municipality of Nunungan in Lanao del Norte and covers a total area of 3,632.74 hectares (8,976.7 acres) with a buffer zone of 889.04 hectares (2,196.9 acres). The area was officially designated as a natural park on 30 July 2007 through Proclamation No. 1344. It is a critical watershed area and the largest remaining rainforest in Lanao del Norte.

== Description ==
The park is situated in the barangay of Inayawan in Nunungan, some 115 kilometres (71 mi) southwest from the city of Iligan near the border with the province of Lanao del Sur and some 14 kilometres (8.7 mi) north from Magapu Point and Illana Bay. It is centered around Mount Inayawan, a conical mountain which is the highest in the province at an altitude of 5,204 feet (1,586 m). Lake Nunungan at 1,535 metres (5,036 ft) is one of the highest lakes in the Philippines and is also found within the park. It consists of three other lakes which supply water for the municipalities in the Kapatagan Valley and holds an abundant supply of fish.

== Wildlife ==
The Mount Inayawan Range Natural Park is home to a diverse fauna. They include endangered and rare species such as the Philippine eagle, Philippine deer, Mindanao flying squirrel, Mindanao scops owl, white-collared kingfisher, Philippine warty pig and Mindanao hornbill.

== See also ==
- List of natural parks of the Philippines
