= List of inactive volcanoes in the Philippines =

This is a list of inactive volcanoes in the Philippines. Volcanoes with no record of eruptions are considered as extinct or inactive. Their physical form since their last activity has been altered by agents of weathering and erosion with the formation of deep and long gullies. Inactive does not necessarily indicate the volcano will not erupt again. Mount Pinatubo had no recorded historical eruption before its cataclysmic 1991 eruption.

The Philippine Institute of Volcanology and Seismology (PHIVOLCS) currently lists 355 volcanoes in the Philippines as inactive. The PHIVOLCS listing is the basis of this list, but with additional information, some were reclassified in the active list or the potentially active list. Volcanoes with solfataric or fumarolic activity indicating active magma supply such as Pocdol Mountains, are placed in the List of potentially active volcanoes in the Philippines. This list shows 339 inactive volcanoes in the Philippines, listed by volcanic region.

== Luzon ==
Volcano	Elevation (ASL)		Province	Coordinates
Volcano	m	ft	Province	Coordinates
Alligator Lake	69	226	Laguna	14°10′N 121°10′E
Anilao Hill	358	1,175	Batangas	13°54′N 121°11′E
Mount Atimbia	650	2,130	Laguna	14°09′N 121°22′E
Mount Bagacay	775	2,543	Camarines Norte	14°13′N 122°49.5′E
Mount Balikabok	849	2,785	Zambales	14°57′N 120°22′E
Mount Balungao	382	1,253	Pangasinan	15°52′N 120°41′E
Mount Banahao de Lucban	1,875	6,152	Quezon, Laguna	14°04′N 121°30′E
Mount Bangcay	406	1,332	Nueva Ecija	15°47′N 120°44′E
Mount Batuan			Sorsogon	12°50′N 123°57′E
Mount Batulao	693	2,274	Batangas, Cavite	14°03′N 120°48′E
Mount Bayaguitos	316	1,037	Laguna	14°10′N 121°24′E
Bigain Hill	464	1,522	Batangas	13°54′N 121°03′E
Mount Binitacan			Sorsogon	12°37′N 124°0′E
Mount Bulalo	525	1,722	Laguna	14°06′N 121°14′E
Mount Burgos	130	430	Nueva Ecija	15°50′N 120°52.5′E
Mount Cabaluyan	285	935	Pangasinan	15°42′N 120°20′E
Mount Cahelietan	280	920	Pangasinan	15°42′N 120°19′E
Mount Cariliao	656	2,152	Batangas	14°08′N 120°45′E
Mount Coloumotan	602	1,975	Sorsogon	12°35′N 123°58′E
Mount Condong	164	538	Pangasinan	15°42.5′N 120°20′E
Mount Culangalan	360	1,180	Sorsogon	12°42′N 123°56′E
Mount Labo	387	1,270	Labo, Camarines Norte	13°53.75′N 123°05.25′E
Colasi Peak	959	3,146	Camarines Norte	13°55′N 123°01′E
Mount Cuyapo	209	686	Nueva Ecija	15°48′N 120°40′E
Mount Daclan	1,500	4,900	Benguet	16°31.27′N 120°48.7′E
Mount Dagatan	120	390	Quezon	14°0′N 121°22′E
Gate Mountains	559	1,834	Sorsogon	12°36′N 124°02′E
Mount Homahan	464	1,522	Sorsogon	12°46.5′N 123°58.5′E
Irosin Caldera			Sorsogon	12°46′N 124°07′E
Mount Jormajan	738	2,421	Sorsogon	12°46′N 124°00′E
Mount Juban	844	2,769	Sorsogon	12°48′N 123°56′E
La Mesa Hill	136	446	Laguna	14°09′N 121°10′E
Mount Lagula	482	1,581	Laguna	14°08′N 121°19′E
Mount Buboy (Note: Part of the Laguna Volcanic Field)	215	705	Laguna	14°06′N 121°14.5′E
Bunsulan Hills	360	1,180	Laguna	14°02′N 121°14.5′E
Imoc Hill	400	1,300	Laguna	14°07′N 121°18′E
Mount Luyong	318	1,043	Laguna	14°07′N 121°15′E
Mount Mabilog	200	660	Laguna	14°06.5′N 121°15′E
Mani Hill	260	850	Laguna	14°02′N 121°15.5′E
Mapait Hills	380	1,250	Laguna	14°03′N 121°14.5′E
Mount Mapula	209	686	Laguna	14°05′N 121°17′E
Mount Olilia	376	1,234	Laguna	14°05′N 121°13′E
Palindan Hill	260	850	Laguna	14°02′N 121°15.5′E
Mount Tamlong	249	817	Laguna	14°05′N 121°14.5′E
Tanza Hill	260	850	Laguna	14°02′N 121°15.5′E
Lake Muhikap (Note: Part of the Laguna Maars)	200	660	Laguna	14°07′30″N 121°20′28″E
Lake Yambo			Laguna	14°07′N 121°22′E
Lake Pandin			Laguna	14°06′43″N 121°22′08″E
Lake Calibato			Laguna	14°05′N 121°22.5′E
Lake Palakpakin			Laguna	14°06.5′N 121°20.5′E
Lake Bunot			Laguna	14°05′N 121°20.5′E
Sampaloc Lake			Laguna	14°05′N 121°20′E
Imoc Maar			Laguna	14°06.5′N 121°18′E
Unnamed Maar			Laguna	14°06′N 121°18′E

== Visayas ==
Volcano	Elevation (ASL)		Province	Coordinates
Volcano	m	ft	Province	Coordinates
Mount Abunug	600	2,000	Southern Leyte	11°02′N 124°42′E
Mount Abuyug	197	646	Leyte	10°47.5′N 124°58′E
Mount Alto	135	443	Leyte	11°6.5′N 124°45′E
Mount Aquiting	523	1,716	Leyte	10°52′N 124°51′E
Mount Ascuero	1,266	4,154	Leyte	11°32′N 124°35′E
Banton Island	596	1,955	Romblon	12°55′N 122°04′E
Mount Baonao	485	1,591	Leyte	11°26′N 124°29′E
Mount Bontes			Negros Oriental	9°10′N 123°10′E
Mount Camalobagoan	1,048	3,438	Leyte	11°37′N 124°37′E
Mount Canandag	432	1,417	Leyte	11°58′N 124°25′E
Mount Cantoloc	820	2,690	Leyte	10°18′N 125°13′E
Mount Capinyayan	980	3,220	Biliran	11°35′N 124°30′E
Mount Caraycaray	437	1,434	Biliran	11°40′N 124°26′E
Carlota Island	49	161	Romblon	13°02′N 121°53′E
Mount Costa Rica	394	1,293	Leyte	11°56′N 124°19′E
Lake Danao (Leyte)	700	2,300	Leyte	11°04′N 124°41′E
Mount Dumali	756	2,480	Mindoro Oriental	13°06.26′N 121°30.75′E
Mount Gayad	618	2,028	Leyte	11°26′N 124°31′E
Mount Giron			Biliran	11°35′N 124°31′E
Mount Guiauasan	1,600	5,200	Biliran	11°37′N 124°29′E
Mount Gunansan	1,045	3,428	Biliran	11°36′N 124°29′E
Isabel Island	72	236	Romblon	13°01′21″N 121°55′40″E
Mount Janagdan	1,200	3,900	Leyte	11°06′N 124°43′E
Mount Kasibor	845	2,772	Leyte	10°52′N 124°53′E
Kirikite Island	202	663	Leyte	11°56′30″N 124°22′5.3″E
Knob Peak	917	3,009	Mindoro Oriental	12°28′N 121°16′E
Mount Laao	1,135	3,724	Leyte	11°07′N 124°48′E
Mount Labi	1,300	4,300	Leyte	11°01′N 124°31′E
Mount Lauaan	1,177	3,862	Biliran	11°31′N 124°31′E
Mount Lobi	1,000	3,300	Leyte	11°01′N 124°49′E
Mount Maagonoc	680	2,230	Leyte	11°1.5′N 124°41.5′E
Mount Macape	315	1,033	Leyte	11°13′N 124°41′E
Maestre de Campo Island	343	1,125	Romblon	12°55′N 121°42′E
Mount Malasimbo			Mindoro Oriental	13°26′N 120°54′E
Mount Maliwatan	1,200	3,900	Biliran	11°39′N 124°27′E
Mount Naujan	490	1,610	Mindoro Oriental	13°12.4′N 121°25′E
Mount Nelangacapan	687	2,254	Southern Leyte	9°56′N 125°15.5′E
Mount Opow	553	1,814	Leyte	11°25′N 124°18′E
Mount Osmeña	380	1,250	Leyte	11°25′N 124°32′E
Mount Pan de Azucar	572	1,877	Iloilo	11°17′N 123°10′E
Mount Panamao	1,056	3,465	Biliran	11°40′N 123°24′E
Mount Proto-Labi	1,120	3,670	Leyte	11°07′N 124°44′E
Mount Sayao	1,266	4,154	Biliran	11°32′N 124°35′E
Simara Island	229	751	Romblon	12°49′N 122°03′E
Mount Tabuanan	929	3,048	Biliran	11°40′N 124°24′E
Mount Tamburok	437	1,434	Leyte	11°33′N 124°26′E
Mount Vulcan	1,015	3,330	Biliran	11°32′N 124°30′E

== Sulu Archipelago / Zamboanga Peninsula ==
Volcano	Elevation (ASL)		Province	Coordinates
Volcano	m	ft	Province	Coordinates
Mount Alu	95	312	Sulu	5°41.5′N 120°53′E
Mount Ampaoid	1,066	3,497		
Mount Ampiro	1,532	5,026	Misamis Occidental	8°23.3′N 123°37.8′E
Mount Bacauan	1,824	5,984	Zamboanga del Sur	7°35′N 123°15′E
Mount Bagsak			Sulu	6°1′40″N 121°8′22″E
Basilan Peak	971	3,186	Basilan	6°33′N 122°04′E
Mount Batelian	620	2,030	Zamboanga del Sur	7°29′N 123°11′E
Mount Bigong	770	2,530	Zamboanga del Sur	7°51.25′N 123°17′E
Mount Bitinan	215	705	Sulu	6°04′N 121°26.5′E
Mount Bolod	164	538	Sulu	5°15.8′N 121°36.9′E
Bucutua Island	89	292	Sulu	6°09′N 121°49′E
Bud Datu			Sulu	6°02′N 120°0.5′E
Mount Buga	549	1,801	Zamboanga del Sur	7°36′N 123°16′E
Bulan Island	329	1,079	Sulu	6°08′N 121°50′E
Mount Bulibu	566	1,857	Zamboanga del Sur	7°42.25′N 123°10.5′E
Mount Capual	312	1,024	Sulu	6°02′N 121°25′E
Mount Dakula	399	1,309	Jolo	5°58.9′N 121°10.7′E
Mount Dupungan	396	1,299	Zamboanga del Sur	7°38′N 123°19.5′E
Mount Guimba	482	1,581	Sulu	6°01.5′N 121°05′E
Gujangan Island	122	400	Sulu	6°04′55″N 121°16′29″E
Mount Imbing	700	2,300	Zamboanga del Sur	7°41′N 123°14′E
Mount Kamawi	71	233	Sulu	5°48.7′N 121°13′E
Mount Kausakar	200	660	Sulu	5°55.5′N 121°22′E
Linawan Island	112	367	Basilan	6°19′N 121°55.5′E
Lugus Island	294	965	Sulu	5°41′N 120°50′E
Mount Mahala	287	942	Sulu	5°56′N 121°07′E
Mount Makam	427	1,401	Sulu	5°56.4′N 120°58.4′E
Mantabuan Island			Tawi-Tawi	5°02′N 120°16′E
Mount Margosa Tubig	412	1,352	Zamboanga del Sur	7°33′N 123°11′E
Mount Matanal	611	2,005	Basilan	6°32′N 122°18′E
Mount Matanding	400	1,300	Sulu	6°02′N 121°04′E
North Mountain	2,183	7,162	Zamboanga del Sur	8°18.5′N 123°37′E
Mount Pagyasngan	783	2,569		
Lake Panamao	399	1,309	Sulu	5°58′N 121°10′E
Pangasahan Hill	217	712	Basilan	6°36.5′N 121°50′E
Pata Island	394	1,293	Sulu	5°49′N 121°09.5′E
Mount Patian	123	404	Sulu	5°51′N 121°05′E
Mount Pinukis	1,532	5,026	Zamboanga del Sur	7°59′N 123°14′E
Mount Sandahan	392	1,286	Sulu	5°54.5′N 121°18′E
Siasi Island	483	1,585	Sulu	5°32′N 120°51′E
Mount Sigangan	283	928	Sulu	5°33.5′N 120°47.5′E
Mount Sining Capan	533	1,749	Basilan	6°38′N 122°12.5′E
Sugarloaf Complex	1,432	4,698	Zamboanga del Sur	8°00′N 123°15′E
Mount Sungal	518	1,699	Sulu	6°01.5′N 121°04.5′E
Mount Talipao	391	1,283	Sulu	5°57′N 121°4.5′E
Tandubas Island			Tawi-Tawi	5°08′N 120°20′E
Tangdi	1,154	3,786		
Tapiantana Island	249	817	Basilan	6°18′6″N 121°57′55″E
Tapul Island	474	1,555	Sulu	5°44′N 120°54′E
Mount Taran	811	2,661	Sulu	5°59.2′N 120°55.9′E
Mount Tarranosa	360	1,180	Zamboanga del Sur	7°32′N 123°8.5′E
Mount Tatalan	102	335	Basilan	6°14′N 121°50′E
Unnamed Cone 01 (Note: Part of the Tukuran Volcanic Field)	237	778	Zamboanga del Sur	7°53.5′N 123°35′E
Unnamed Cone 02	200	660	Zamboanga del Sur	7°53.5′N 123°33.5′E
Unnamed Cone 03	319	1,047	Zamboanga del Sur	7°54.5′N 123°33.5′E
Unnamed Cone 04	276	906	Zamboanga del Sur	7°56′N 123°33′E
Unnamed Cone 05	492	1,614	Zamboanga del Sur	7°55′N 123°32.5′E
Unnamed Cone 06	472	1,549	Zamboanga del Sur	7°55.5′N 123°31′E
Unnamed Cone 07	88	289	Zamboanga del Sur	7°53.5′N 123°31.25′E
Unnamed Cone 08	200	660	Zamboanga del Sur	7°57′N 123°31′E
Unnamed Cone 09	366	1,201	Zamboanga del Sur	7°55′N 123°30′E
Unnamed Cone 10	360	1,180	Zamboanga del Sur	7°57′N 123°29′E
Unnamed Cone 11	331	1,086	Zamboanga del Sur	7°56′N 123°28.5′E
Unnamed Cone 12	590	1,940	Zamboanga del Sur	7°57.5′N 123°27.5′E
Tulayan Island	161	528	Sulu	6°1.5′N 121°19′E
Mount Ukan	299	981	Sulu	5°55′N 121°16.5′E
Mount Urot	430	1,410	Sulu	5°59′N 121°15.5′E
West Bolod Island	152	499	Sulu	6°15′N 121°36.2′E
Mount Wood			Zamboanga del Norte	7°51′N 123°10′E

== Mindanao ==
Volcano	Elevation (ASL)		Province	Coordinates
Volcano	m	ft	Province	Coordinates
Mount Akir-Akir	526	1,726	Maguindanao del Norte	7°25.27′N 124°25.45′E
Balo Dome	873	2,864	South Cotabato	6°18.5′N 125°10.26′E
Base Peak	598	1,962	South Cotabato	6°14.8′N 125°08.85′E
Mount Baya	1,380	4,530	Lanao del Sur	7°47.23′N 124°05.73′E
Bee Hive Peak	808	2,651	South Cotabato	6°09.26′N 125°23.5′E
Mount Binaca	1,004	3,294	Maguindanao del Norte	6°57′N 124°01′E
Mount Bito	1,058	3,471	Cotabato	7°30′N 124°17′E
Mount Blik	1,198	3,930	Cotabato	6°57′30.9″N 124°12′50.5″E
Mount Catmon	1,624	5,328	Lanao del Norte	8°03.4′N 123°50.82′E
Mount Gap (Note: Part of the Bolacanon Volcanic Field)	1,060	3,480	Cotabato	6°52′N 125°7.5′E
Mount Libadan	826	2,710	Cotabato	6°53′N 125°6.5′E
Unnamed 01	640	2,100	Cotabato	6°56′N 125°8.5′E
Unnamed 02	982	3,222	Cotabato	6°53.5′N 125°8′E
Unnamed 03	356	1,168	Cotabato	6°51.5′N 125°09′E
Unnamed 04	592	1,942	Cotabato	6°50.5′N 125°8′E
Unnamed 05	804	2,638	Cotabato	6°53.5′N 125°6.5′E
Unnamed 06	788	2,585	Cotabato	6°53′N 125°6′E
Unnamed 07	650	2,130	Cotabato	6°55′N 125°5′E
Unnamed 08	444	1,457	Cotabato	6°52.5′N 125°4′E
Unnamed 09	497	1,631	Cotabato	6°51′N 125°4.5′E
Unnamed 10	798	2,618	Cotabato	6°51.5′N 125°6′E
Unnamed 11	592	1,942	Cotabato	6°50.25′N 125°6.5′E
Unnamed 12	624	2,047	Cotabato	6°50′N 125°6′E
Unnamed 13	542	1,778	Cotabato	6°49′N 125°6.5′E
Unnamed 14	400	1,300	Cotabato	6°48.5′N 125°6.25′E
Unnamed 15	302	991	Cotabato	6°47.75′N 125°6′E
Unnamed 16	208	682	Cotabato	6°46′N 125°7′E
Unnamed 17	792	2,598	Cotabato	6°52.25′N 126°6′E
Mount Bosa	2,083	6,834	South Cotabato	6°05.88′N 124°42.45′E
Mount Bucas	450	1,480	Lanao del Norte	8°05.05′N 123°51.66′E
Mount Butay	679	2,228	Camiguin	9°07′N 124°46′E
Mount Butung	684	2,244	Bukidnon	7°45′N 125°5′E
Mount Cabugao	812	2,664	Cotabato, Lanao	7°32.5′N 124°14′E
Mount Calabugao	1,864	6,115	Bukidnon	8°34′N 125°7′E
Campana Hill	676	2,218	Camiguin	9°12.5′N 124°42.5′E
Carling Hill	800	2,600	Camiguin	9°13′N 124°40.01′E
Mount Dagumbaan	1,128	3,701	South Cotabato	7°49′N 124°56.75′E
Mount Dos Hermanas	814	2,671	South Cotabato	7°38.45′N 124°07.75′E
Mount Gadungan	1,342	4,403	Lanao del Sur	7°46.7′N 124°4.7′E
Mount Galantay	1,274	4,180	Lanao	7°53′N 124°0′E
Mount Guinsiliban	581	1,906	Camiguin	9°06′N 124°46′E
Mount Gurain	1,825	5,988	Lanao del Sur	7°54.5′N 124°6.5′E
Mount Inayawan	1,174	3,852	Lanao del Norte	7°49.5′N 124°58′E
Mount Iniaoan	1,535	5,036	Lanao del Norte	7°49′N 124°55.5′E
Mount Kaatoan	2,153	7,064	Bukidnon	8°08′N 124°55′E
Mount Kabaritan	1,157	3,796	Bukidnon	7°52′N 124°40′E
Mount Kidongin	1,144	3,753	Bukidnon	7°45.5′N 124°49′E
Mount Kilakron	2,329	7,641	South Cotabato	7°57.5′N 124°52.5′E
Mount Kitanglad	2,899	9,511	Bukidnon	8°7.7′N 124°55.5′E
Mount Kitabud	1,167	3,829	Lanao del Sur	7°17.1′N 124°39.72′E
Mount Koloko	1,074	3,524	Bukidnon	7°50.4′N 124°55.7′E
Lauan Hill (Note: Part of the Lanao Volcanic Field)	64	210	Lanao del Norte	7°58.5′N 123°48.5′E
Pindulunan Hill	100	330	Lanao del Norte	7°56′N 123°49′E
Mount Kabanangan	340	1,120	Lanao del Norte	7°56.5′N 123°49.5′E
Unnamed Cone 01	60	200	Lanao del Norte	7°56′N 123°49.25′E
Unnamed Cone 02	300	980	Lanao del Norte	7°56.5′N 123°50.5′E
Unnamed Cone 03	280	920	Lanao del Norte	7°55.75′N 123°50.5′E
Unnamed Cone 04	120	390	Lanao del Norte	7°55′N 123°49′E
Unnamed Cone 05	275	902	Lanao del Norte	7°52′N 123°51′E
Unnamed Cone 06	259	850	Lanao del Norte	7°52.5′N 123°51.5′E
Unnamed Cone 07	120	390	Lanao del Norte	7°55.5′N 123°52′E
Unnamed Cone 08	260	850	Lanao del Norte	7°57.25′N 123°51.5′E
Unnamed Cone 09	250	820	Lanao del Norte	7°57.5′N 123°52′E
Unnamed Cone 10	270	890	Lanao del Norte	7°57′N 123°52.5′E
Unnamed Cone 11	128	420	Lanao del Norte	7°56.25′N 123°53.5′E
Unnamed Cone 12	358	1,175	Lanao del Norte	7°54′N 123°53.5′E
Unnamed Cone 13	394	1,293	Lanao del Norte	7°56′N 123°55.5′E
Mount Sucadan	498	1,634	Lanao del Norte	7°57.5′N 123°54.5′E
Mount Magampao	1,468	4,816	Cotabato	7°37.1′N 124°35.88′E
Mount Malambo	900	3,000	Cotabato	7°39.2′N 125°18.7′E
Mount Malibao	1,500	4,900	South Cotabato	6°11.5′N 124°54′E
Mount Mambajao	1,525	5,003	Camiguin	9°10.3′N 124°43.3′E
Mount Mamot	1,002	3,287	Cotabato	7°58′N 124°08′E
Mount Mangaban	780	2,560	Misamis Oriental	8°30.5′N 125°0.5′E
Mount Maranat	1,858	6,096	Lanao, Bukidnon	7°46.3′N 124°33.7′E
Mount Mariyug	1,490	4,890	South Cotabato	7°34.6′N 124°35.5′E
Mount Micbacan	500	1,600	Lanao	7°43.5′N 123°54′E
Minokol Hill			Camiguin	9°13′N 124°39′E
Mount Nanluyaw	2,602	8,537	Bukidnon	8°08′N 124°51.5′E
Mount Navaro	1,122	3,681	Cotabato	6°23.5′N 125°01′E
Mount Obulan	1,245	4,085	Misamis Oriental	8°48′N 124°51.5′E
Mount Paco	524	1,719	Surigao del Norte	9°35.6′N 125°31.1′E
Mount Pamalihi	1,956	6,417	Misamis Oriental	8°49.8′N 124°55.2′E
Mount Pana	336	1,102	Lanao del Norte	7°54.9′N 123°54.4′E
Mount Patulangon			Davao del Sur	6°54′N 125°23′E
Mount Pudung	1,558	5,112	Bukidnon	7°55.4′N 124°38′E
Mount Quezon	652	2,139	Cotabato	6°35′N 124°57′E
Mount Sagada	1,128	3,701	Lanao del Sur	8°07.1′N 124°25.33′E
Mount Salimbal	892	2,927	Bukidnon	7°50.5′N 124°51.5′E
Mount Sigayan	602	1,975	Lanao del Sur	7°47.5′N 123°46′E
Mount Sinako	1,590	5,220	Davao del Norte	7°29′N 125°16.3′E
Mount Sibulan	1,292	4,239	Davao	6°55′N 125°24.5′E
Mount Table	576	1,890	Cotabato	7°28′N 124°48′E
Mount Tagoan	1,144	3,753	Bukidnon	7°47′N 124°48′E
Mount Talomo	2,674	8,773	Davao del Sur, Cotabato	7°02′N 125°20′E
Mount Ticalan	1,041	3,415	Bukidnon	8°7.5′N 124°41′E
Tres Marias Hill	771	2,530	Camiguin	9°11.6′N 124°41.01′E

== See also ==
- List of active volcanoes in the Philippines
- List of potentially active volcanoes in the Philippines
- List of mountains in the Philippines
