= Cabalian Volcano =

Active volcano in the Philippines

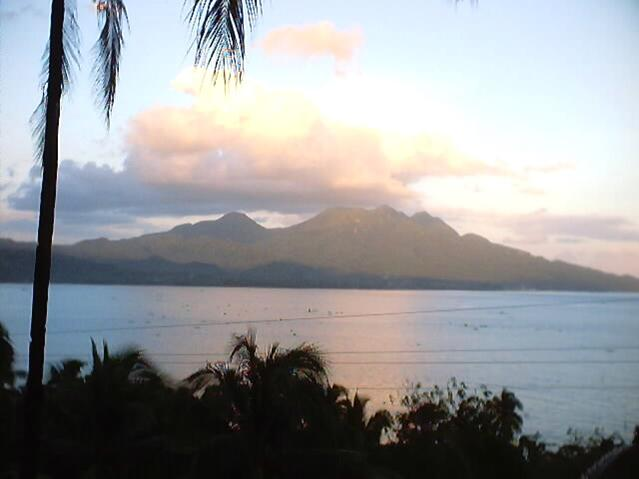

Highest point
- Elevation: 945 m (3,100 ft)
- Prominence: 945 m (3,100 ft)
- Listing: Active volcanoes in the Philippines
- Coordinates: 10°16′47″N 125°12′56″E

Geography
- Location within Philippines

Geology
- Rock age: Quaternary
- Mountain type: Stratovolcano
- Volcanic arc: Leyte arc
- Last eruption: 1820 ± 30 years

Climbing
- Easiest route: from San Juan, Southern Leyte on the SW flank of the volcano

Cabalian Volcano is an active stratovolcano located in the province of Southern Leyte (Region VIII) in the Philippines.

== Physical features ==
Cabalian is classified by the Philippine Institute of Volcanology and Seismology (PHIVOLCS) as active with solfataric activity. Radiocarbon dating on a pyroclastic flow deposit from the volcano estimated that the last eruption was in 1820 +/- 30 years.

The stratovolcano has an elevation of 945 metres (3,100 ft) with a base diameter of 8.5 kilometres (5.3 mi). The predominant rock type is andesite. Beside solfataras, other thermal features present are hot springs located on the east and west flank of the volcano. Mainit Hot Spring in the municipality of Anahawan, Southern Leyte has a temperature of 63.4–63.9 °C (146.1–147.0 °F).

=== Cabalian Lake ===
Cabalian Lake (Lake Danao) is a 500 m (1,600 ft) wide crater lake that occupies the summit crater of the volcano. The surface elevation of the lake is at 733 metres (2,405 ft). This lake is often confused with Lake Danao, which is located near Ormoc City in Leyte province.

== See also ==
- List of volcanoes in the Philippines
  - List of active volcanoes in the Philippines
  - List of potentially active volcanoes in the Philippines
  - List of inactive volcanoes in the Philippines
