= Babuyan Island =

Island in the Philippines

Native name: Curuga Mabuyan
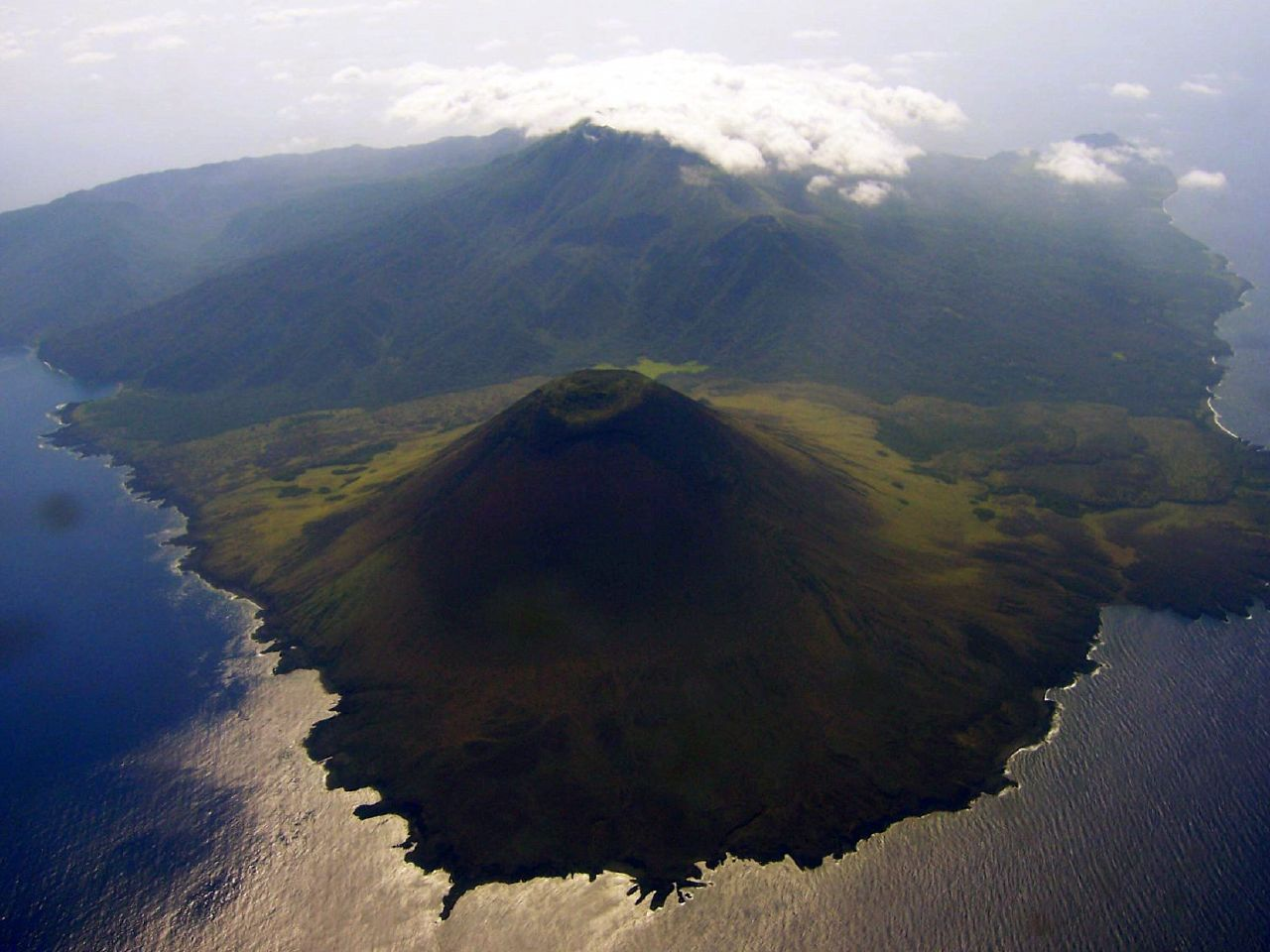
- Smith Volcano in the foreground with Babuyan Claro Volcano (behind), the two active volcanoes of Babuyan Island

- Location within Philippines

Geography
- Coordinates: 19°31′20″N 121°57′13″E
- Archipelago: Babuyan Islands
- Adjacent to: Balintang Channel; Luzon Strait
- Area: 100 km^{2} (39 sq mi)
- Length: 8 mi (13 km)
- Width: 6 mi (10 km)
- Highest elevation: 1,064 m (3491 ft)
- Highest point: Babuyan Claro

Administration
- Philippines
- Region: Cagayan Valley
- Province: Cagayan
- Municipality: Calayan
- Barangay: Babuyan Claro

Demographics
- Population: 1,910 (2020)
- Pop. density: 19.1/km^{2} (49.5/sq mi)

Additional information

Babuyan Island (sometimes called Babuyan Claro or Curuga Mabuyan, the clear-sighted) is the highest and northernmost island in the Babuyan Islands in Luzon Strait north of Luzon Island in the Philippines and also directly south of Taiwan via Bashi Channel to Luzon Strait. The whole island makes up the barangay of Babuyan Claro, that constitute the municipality of Calayan in Cagayan province. The volcanic island has a population of 1,910 as of the 2020 census, up from 1,423 in 2010.

== History ==
The language of Babuyan Island is sometimes classified as a dialect of Ivatan. Babuyan was depopulated by the Spanish and only repopulated at the end of the 19th century with families from Batan Island, most of them speakers of one of the Ivatan dialects.

== Geography ==
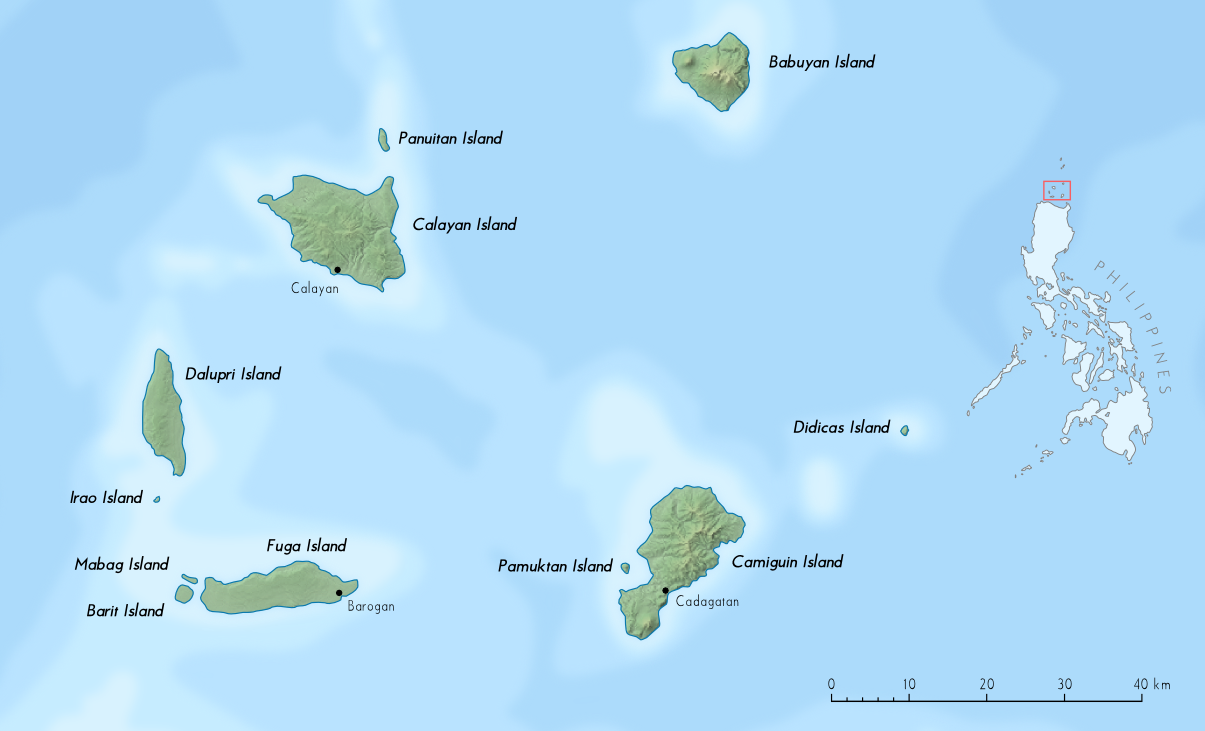
Babuyan is the northernmost island of the Babuyan archipelago

Babuyan Island lies about 27 mi (43 km) south-southwestward of Balintang Islands, and about 55 mi (89 km) northward of Cape Engaño Lighthouse. The nearly triangular island is about 8 mi (13 km) long in a northeast and southwest direction, with an average width of about 6 mi (9.7 km). The island seems to be steep all around. A reef projects from its western point. The south point is steep and rocky with a black, rocky, sugarloaf islet, called Pan de Azucar, close inshore.

=== Volcanoes ===
Near the western point of the island is Smith Volcano, also known as Mount Babuyan, about 2,257 ft (688 m) high. In the middle of the island and east-southeastward from Smith is Babuyan Claro, also known as Mount Pangasun, about 3,491 ft (1,064 m) high, between which the mountains are much lower, so that from a considerable distance eastward it appears as a round mountain with a detached hillock northward. There are three other volcanic cones with no historic eruptions on the island: Cayonan, Dionisio and Naydi.

== See also ==
- List of islands of the Philippines
