= Musuan Peak =

Active volcano on Mindanao, Philippines

- Mount Calayo
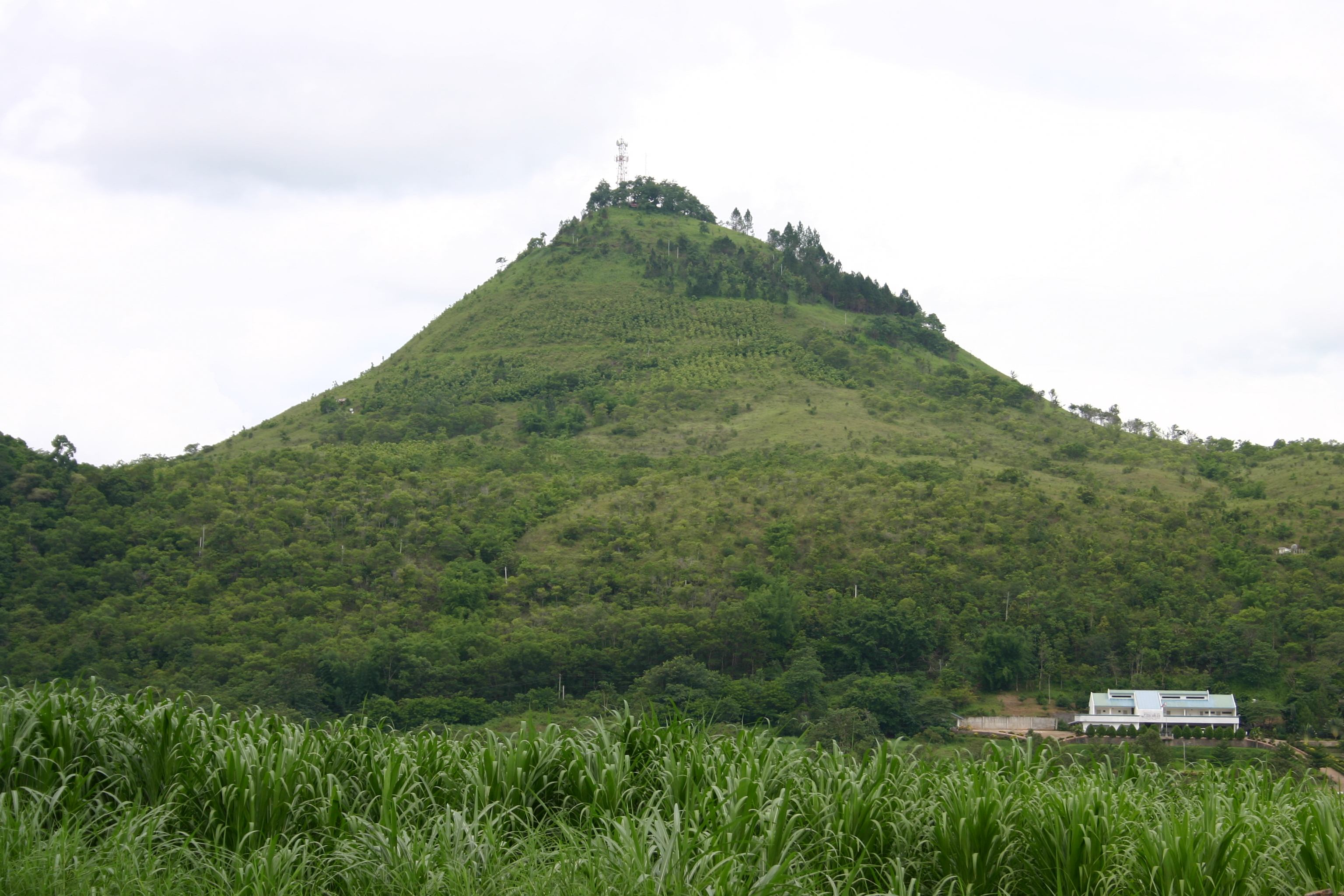

Highest point
- Elevation: 646 m (2,119 ft)
- Listing: Active volcanoes
- Coordinates: 7°52′36″N 125°4′6″E

Geography
- Location within Mindanao mainland Location within Philippines
- Country: Philippines
- Region: Northern Mindanao
- Province: Bukidnon
- City/municipality: Maramag

Geology
- Mountain type: Lava dome
- Last eruption: 1886 or 1887

Climbing
- Easiest route: Hike

Musuan Peak or Mount Musuan /ˈmʊswən/, also known as Mount Calayo (/kəˈlɑːjoʊ/, literally "Fire Mountain") is an active volcano in Maramag, Bukidnon, on the island of Mindanao in the Philippines. It is 4.5 kilometres (2.8 mi) south of the city of Valencia, province of Bukidnon, and 81 kilometres (50 mi) southeast of Cagayan de Oro.

== Physical characteristics ==
Musuan is a lava dome and tuff cone.

It has an elevation of 646 metres (2,119 ft) asl, and a base diameter of 3 kilometres (1.9 mi).

== Eruptions ==
The Philippine Institute of Volcanology and Seismology reports that Musuan erupted in 1866 and 1867, but the Smithsonian Institution's Global Volcanism Program records another eruption, possibly phreatic, that "burned everything around it." The explosion supposedly occurred four years before the 1891 visit of a Jesuit priest, who reported that he could not examine the volcano more closely because of strong solfataric activity.

A strong seismic swarm occurred near Musuan in 1976, and again around mid-2011.

Musuan is one of the active volcanoes in the Philippines, which are all part of the Pacific ring of fire.

== Flora ==
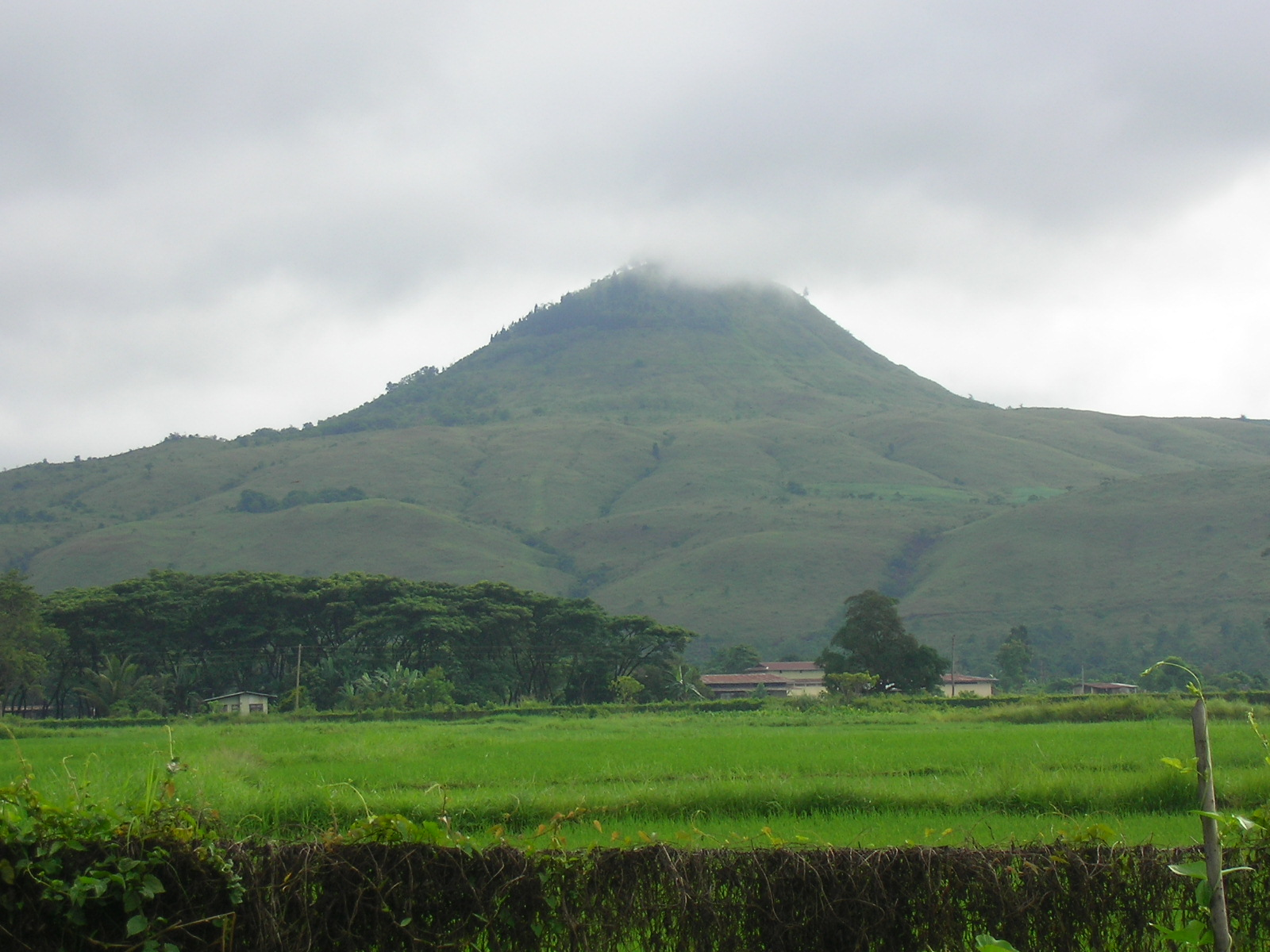
Musuan Peak with clouds partly covering the peak

Mount Musuan's northern slope is still covered by a primary rainforest. The rest is covered predominantly by Cogon grass (Imperata cylindrica). Reforestation efforts on the bare areas, both in tree-planting drives and by Central Mindanao University personnel, have established temporary forests of Acacia mangium and conifers.

There are 524 species of plants in Mount Musuan under 353 genera and 135 families. 301 species are trees, 51 shrubs, 50 grasses and sedges, 46 herbs, 42 vines, 31 ferns, and 3 fern allies. 188 species (35%) are economically important, 128 species (24%) are endemic, and 3 (1%) are endangered species. Musuan peak has approximately 6,354 individual trees. The most common tree species (in density and frequency) are the Melanolepis multiglandulosa (Kamala tree) and Colona serratifolia, followed by Clausena brevistyla and Alstonia scholaris (Blackboard tree). Three species of pteridophytes are locally threatened: Marsilea crenata ("apat-apat"), Ceratopteris thalictroides ("pakung-sungay"), and Lycopodiella cernua (clubmoss). 10 species of pteridophytes are endemic to the area.

== History and infrastructure ==
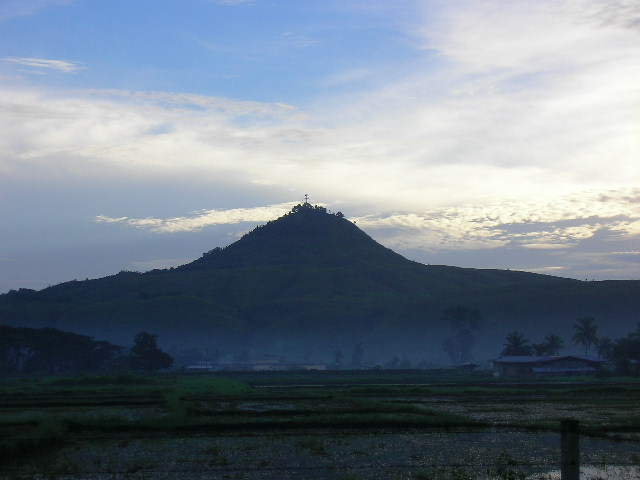
A view of Musuan Peak from the surrounding rice fields at dawn. Part of the Central Mindanao University motorpool buildings are visible on the bottom left.

According to the legend, Musuan Peak was made out of feces dropped by a man named Tapogak. One day a man named Babaydan and his whole family along with Tapogak bringing his belongings were taken up to heaven. Afterwards, Tapogak found some honey and ate more of it, causing him to defecate from heaven atop. Because of his gluttony, he was kicked out of heaven by his friends, fell down and never reached heaven again. His feces became a mountain named "Indus ni Tapogak", which means "Tapogak's feces" in Umayamnon language, now known as Musuan Peak.

Mount Musuan's lack of any visible crater has led to some local skepticism of it being an active volcano. Still, the imagery evoked by its name variant 'Mount Calayo' (Fire Mountain) and the stories told by Indigenous Bukidnon people keep people wary of the relatively small mountain which doesn't look like a volcano at all.

Valencia City is located north of the peak, the Central Mindanao University (CMU) and Barangay Dologon at the southwest, and the Pulangi River on the entire eastern side.

At the foot of Musuan Peak is the Mount Musuan Zoological and Botanical Garden of the Central Mindanao University. It includes a butterfly greenhouse and a reforestation nursery among its buildings. The Sayre Highway and a research center of the Philippine Carabao Center are located on the western slopes. It has a tourist shop which sells dairy products made from Carabao milk. South of the mountain are the university agricultural facilities including a cattle ranch, a poultry farm, greenhouses, and a dairy.

Due to its proximity to the university and the university town proper, it has become a popular destination for students, teachers, and tourists; either for picnics or a study of the flora and fauna of one of the few remnants of the jungles that once covered the valleys of the surrounding areas. From its isolated position in the middle of the valley and the very small surface area of its highest point (only a few meters), the entire countryside is visible from the top. Currently its slopes has been the target of extensive reforestation efforts partly paid for by the establishment of toll gates to hikers intending to go up the mountain.

== See also ==
- List of volcanoes in the Philippines
  - List of active volcanoes in the Philippines
  - List of potentially active volcanoes in the Philippines
  - List of inactive volcanoes in the Philippines
- Philippine Institute of Volcanology and Seismology
- Pulangi River
