= Central Mindanao University Laboratory High School =

Public high school in Bukidnon, Philippines

Location
- Sayre Highway, University Town, Musuan, Maramag, Bukidnon, Philippines

Information
- Type: Public science high school
- Motto: Values Formation. Academic Excellence.
- Established: June 19, 1965
- Authority: College of Education—Central Mindanao University
- President: Dr. Rolito G. Eballe
- Dean: Dr. Julie Ann A. Orobia
- Principal: Dr. Maris Jade Q. Orongan
- Staff: 9
- Faculty: 37
- Grades: 7 to 12
- Enrollment: 794 (2025-2026)
- Campus type: University Town
- Song: CMU Hymn
- Sports: Yes
- Team name: Vectors
- Accreditation: Philippine Association of State Universities and Colleges; Accrediting Agency of Chartered Colleges and Universities in the Philippines
- Publication: Viewer
- Yearbook: Horizon
- Affiliations: Mindanao Association State Colleges and Universities Foundation
- Website: cmu.edu.ph

Central Mindanao University Laboratory High School (CMULHS) is a secondary science laboratory school of Central Mindanao University located in Musuan, Maramag, Bukidnon, Philippines. CMULHS is under the management of the College of Education at the university that acts as a separate department and maintains its own set of administrators.

CMULHS is used as a training ground for the College of Education in the university for pre-service student teachers. Students who wish to study in CMULHS must first take an entrance exam called the 'University Laboratory High School Admission Test' or ULHSAT. CMULHS does not accept transferees.

== History ==
Central Mindanao University Laboratory High School traces its roots from a farm school organized by the Americans. It was established in 1910 as Mailag Agricultural (Industrial) School in Colonia, Mailag, Malaybalay (now part of Valencia City), Bukidnon under Santos Cudal, the head teacher. It offered the first four grades under the elementary agriculture curriculum and produced its first graduates in 1917. By virtue id Executive Order No. 59 dated December 18, 1918, its name was changed to Bukidnon Agricultural School, and it offered the last three grades of the same curriculum with Martin Callao as its principal.

In 1921, the school was transferred to Managok, Malaybalay City and was renamed Bukidnon Rural High School under Proclamation No. 30. The first batch of secondary agriculture students graduated in 1927.

By virtue of Act No. 337, the name was changed to Bukidnon Agricultural High School, with the agriculture curriculum exclusive for male students only. Commonwealth Act No. 313 gave the school a new name — Bukidnon National Agricultural School — under Dr. Felipe Cevallos and Nicodemes Flores as superintendent and principal, respectively. This time, secondary homemaking curriculum was offered to female students with Esmeralda Collado Relis as the first girl to enroll.

In 1943 to 1945, the school was closed due to World War II. After the war the school reopened. Due to the aftermath of the war, it was transferred to Musuan, Maramag, Bukindnon. On June 21, 1952, President Elpidio Quirino signed Republic Act 807 or 'Mindanao Agricultural College Charter' which installed Zosimo Montemayor as president, with its high school department headed by Narciso Pepeito.

On June 19, 1965, by virtue of Republic Act 4498, Mindanao Agricultural College was granted university status and was renamed Central Mindanao University. The high school was then headed by Felixberto Roquia. In 1965 to 1966, the general academic curriculum was introduced. Ireneo Mendoza was the acting head in 1968 to 1969 and Leonardo Chua in 1969 to 1970. In 1970 to 1971, both revised curricula implemented: vocational and general academic curriculum with Leopoldo Roque as principal.

In June 1987, the Vocational Agricultural Secondary Curriculum was phased out and the Science Curriculum was implemented. In 1990 to 1996, the school operated a pure science curriculum. In 1996 to 2008, the science and general secondary curriculum was again implemented, having two sets of honor students. In 2008, the school again operated a pure science curriculum.

In 2012, the school adopted the K–12 education program. The last batch of the old education program (four-year high school education) graduated in 2015.

== Curriculum ==
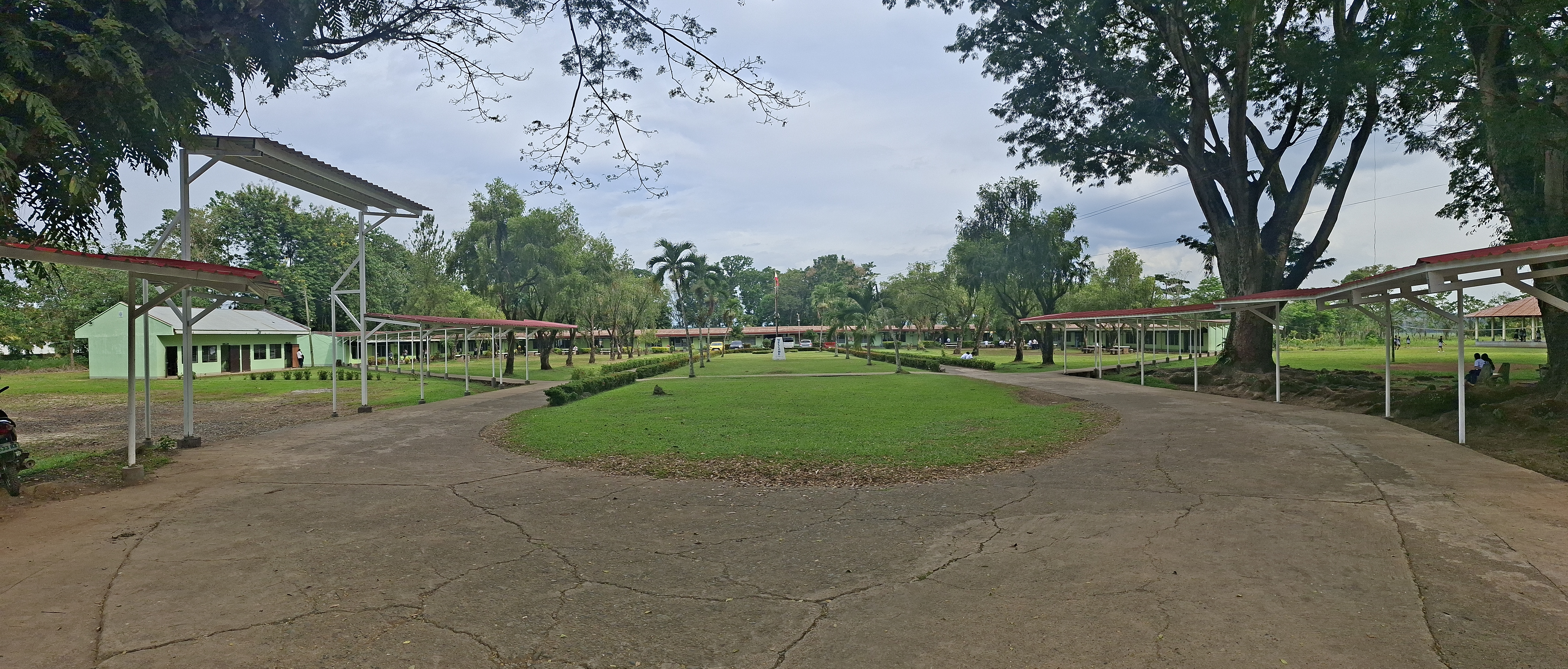
Central Mindanao University Laboratory High School campus from a vantage point of the school's front gate.

The current CMULHS curriculum is the former Science Curriculum, for those students who passed the ULHSAT at the top percentile ranks.

Formerly, the curriculum had only two sections per year level. In 2005, the administration phased out the New Secondary Curriculum (NSEC) and replaced the NSEC section with a Science Curriculum section. As of 2008, the Science Curriculum is the only remaining curriculum offered in CMULHS.

The school is using a science-based curriculum, which emphasizes and deals more with Sciences (General Science, Geology, Earth Sciences, Inorganic and Bio Chemistry, Biology, Genetics, Physics, and Environmental Sciences), and Mathematics (Algebra, Consumer Mathematics, Trigonometry, Geometry, Calculus, Computer Sciences, and Statistics).

Principals, Acting Principals, Officers-in-Charge, and Directors of CMULHS
Felixberto Roquia, 1965–1968
Ireneo Mendoza, 1968–1969
Dr. Leonardo Chua, 1969–1970
Leopoldo Roque, 1970–1973
Dr. Leonardo Chua, 1973–1974
Juan Nagtalon, 1974–1975
Tomasito Redoble, 1975–1977
Elsie Laurente, 1977–1978
Salvacion Limbo, 1978–1981
Juan Busto Callejo, 1981–1983
Dante Santiago, 1983–1985
Wenceslao Tianero, 1985–1986
Andrea Azuelo, 1986–1993
Anacleta Barcebal, 1993–1994
Severino Cupida, 1994–1999
Dr. Luzminda Gurrea, 1999–2008
Virgencita Caro, 2008–2011
Dr. Denis Tan, 2011–2019
Ma. Elena E. Derije, 2019–2023
Dr. Joemar B. Capuyan, 2023–2025
Dr. Maris Jade Q. Orongan, 2025–present

== Clubs and organizations ==
=== Clubs ===
The following are the school clubs in CMULHS:

- Enthuasiastic League of Innovative English Students (ELITES)
- Nagkakaisang Organisasyong Yaring Pilipino (NOYPI)
- Young Mathematician Computer Club (YMC²)
- Young Thinkers Science Club (YTSC)
- Society of Organized and Civilized Youth (SOCY)
- Competent Alliance of Physical Education Students (CAPES)
- Performing Arts Club (PAC)
- Brilliant Young Technical Erudites (BYTES)
- CMULHS Vectors Varsity

=== Organizations ===
The following are the school organizations in CMULHS:

- Central Mindanao University Laboratory High School Supreme Student Council Organization (CMULHSSSCO)
- The Viewer
- The Horizon
- FLUX Movement Media Guild
- Citizenship Advancement Training (CAT)
- University Laboratory High School (ULHS) Band

== Notable people ==
=== Alumni ===
- Bonar Laureto and Deorex David Navaja (Class 1999) – competed in Germany in a scientist research contest sponsored by the World Young Researchers on Environment (WYRE) in October 2000 and emerged among the top 23 entries out of 73 entries worldwide. They were also given research internship awards from the Merck Laboratories in the Expo 2000 in Hannover.
- Osmund Nino B. Amoroso, Leo Marconi R. Carrillo, and Ray Ian Chris Y. Oco (Class 2000) – represented the Philippines in the International Science and Engineering Fair held in Detroit, Michigan, United States in 2000 won Fourth Grand Award Honorable Mention Award, sponsored by Eastman Kodak Company in the Intel ISEF Best of Category Award with their entry, "BO307: Histochemical Tests and Antibacterial Effect of Oak-Leaf Fern (Drynaria quercifolia (Linn.) J.Sm) Extracts," among more than 1,000 entries worldwide.
- Minelle Josem "Win-win" Cabinta (Class 2008) – contestant of The Biggest Loser: Pinoy Edition Season 1.
- Efren Leo John Aribal (Class 2008) – represented the Philippines as a youth ambassador to ASEAN-Korea Future Oriented Youth Exchange Program (FOYEP) in Seoul, Korea on January 27-February 2, 2016. Also a member of the Philippine Delegate to The Ship for Southeast Asian and Japanese Youth Program (SSEAYP) 2018.
- Troy Valdehueza (Class 2018) – a Bagong Rizal: Pag-asa ng Bayan 2017 awardee. Also won first place as the official representative of The Philippines in the ASEAN Youth Video Contest 2018 held in Singapore, sponsored by the ASEAN Foundation and US-Mission to ASEAN.

=== Faculty ===
- Prof. Andrea G. Azuelo – a Metrobank Foundation, Inc. for the Search of Outstanding Teachers: Secondary Category awardee.

== See also ==
- Central Mindanao University
- Philippine Science High School System
- Regional Science High School Union
- Science, Technology, Engineering and Mathematics Education Program
