= Babuyan Claro Volcano =

Volcano in the Philippines

- Mount Pangasun
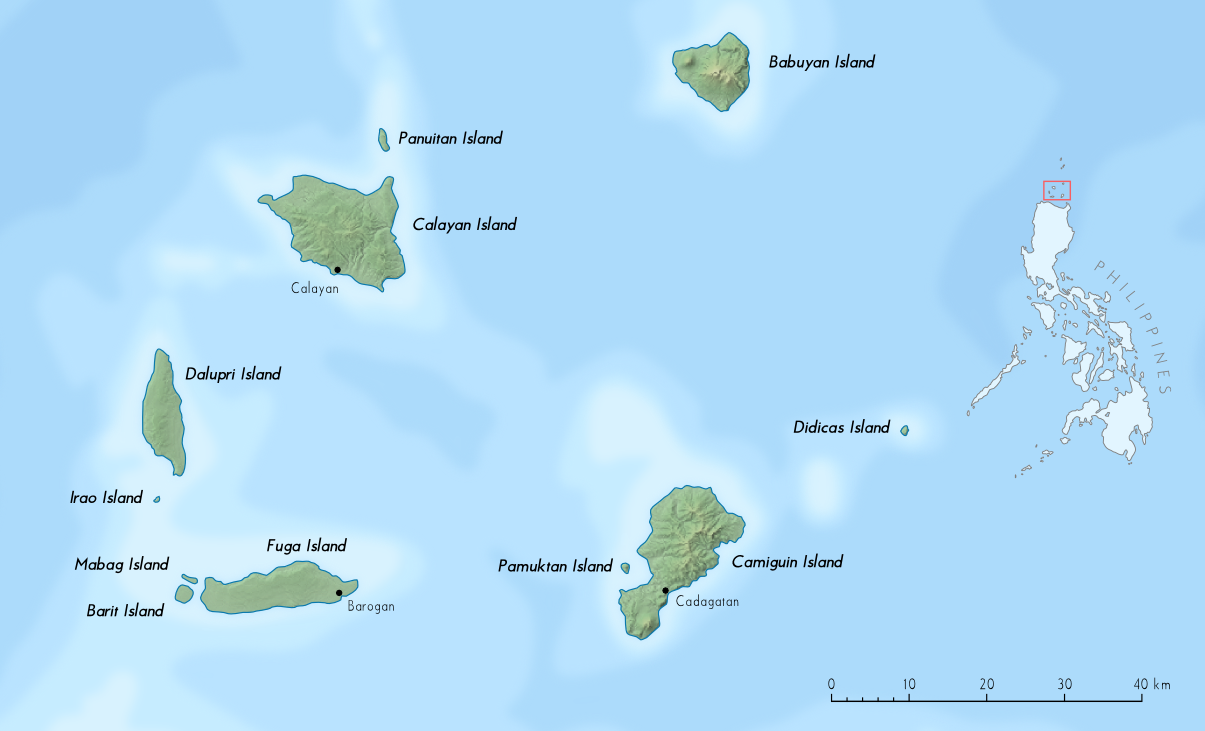

Highest point
- Elevation: 1,007 m (3,304 ft)
- Prominence: 1,007 m (3,304 ft)
- Listing: Active volcanoes in the Philippines
- Coordinates: 19°31′24″N 121°56′24″E

Geography
- Location within Luzon Location within Philippines
- Country: Philippines
- Region: Cagayan Valley
- Province: Cagayan
- City/municipality: Calayan

Geology
- Rock age: 2.32+/-0.35 Ma – 1480+/-50 B.P
- Mountain type: Stratovolcano
- Volcanic arc: Luzon Volcanic Arc
- Last eruption: 1924

Babuyan Claro Volcano, also known as Mount Pangasun, is an active volcano located on Babuyan Island, the northernmost of the Babuyan group of islands in Luzon Strait, north of the main island of Luzon in the Philippines. It is classified as one of the active volcanoes of the country with the last confirmed eruption in 1860.

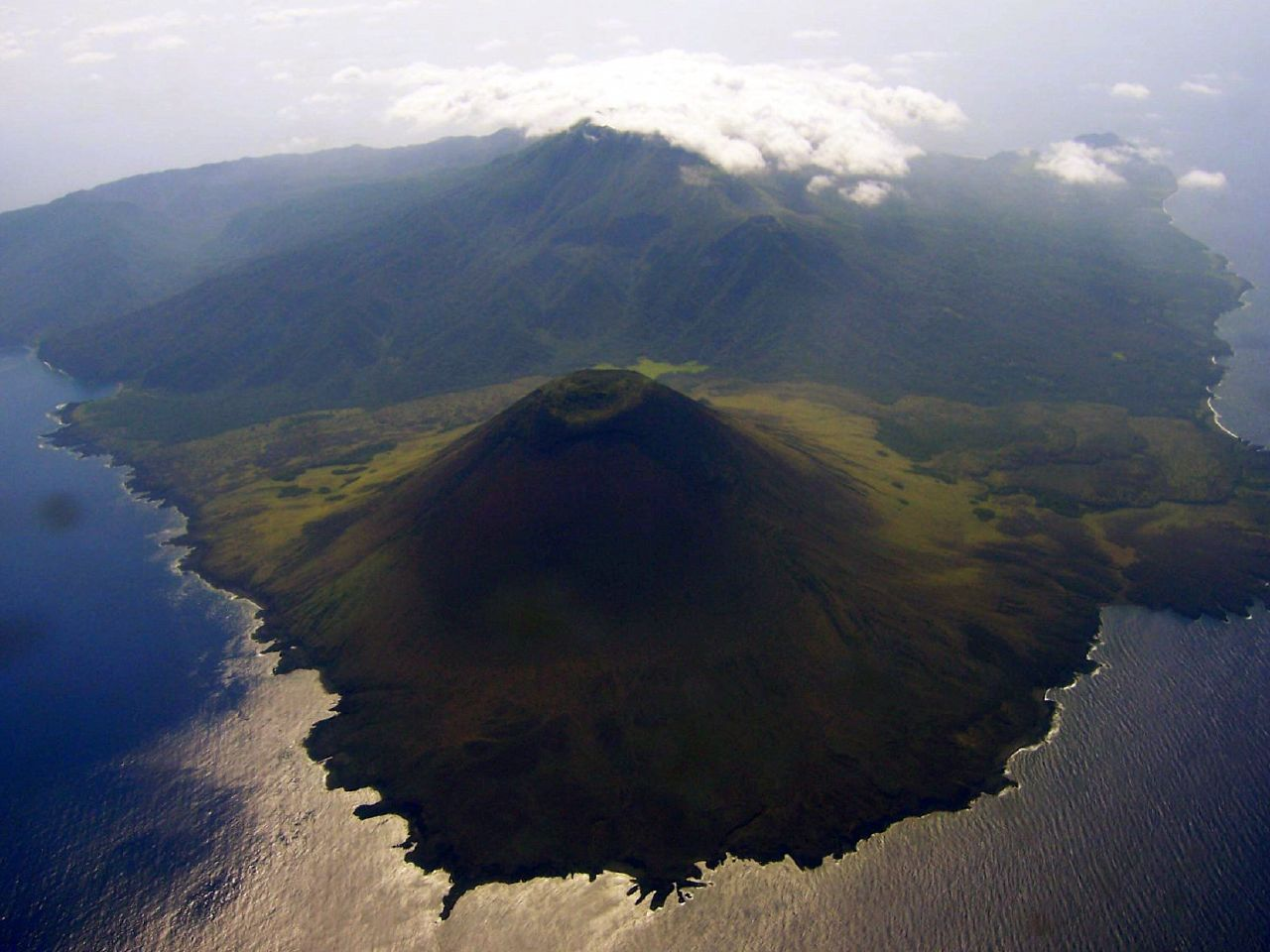
Babuyan Claro in the background and Smith Volcano foreground.

The volcano is politically located in the similarly-named Barangay of Babuyan Claro, in the Municipality of Calayan, Cagayan province, in the Cagayan Valley Region (Region II) of the country.

== Physical features ==
Babuyan Claro is a stratovolcano with an elevation of 843 meters (2,766 ft) and a base diameter of about 8 kilometers (5.0 mi) located in the center of Babuyan Island (also referred to as Babuyan Claro Island). It has four morphologically-fresh volcanic edifices: Mt. Cayonan in the south, Mt. Naydi and Mt. Dionisio in the southeast. Babuyan Claro has two very well-preserved craters 300 and 400 meters (980 and 1,310 ft) in diameter.

The Askedna Hot Spring is located at the southern basal slope of Babuyan Claro. It has a temperature range of 44.6 to 50.2 °C (112.3 to 122.4 °F). The water is slightly acidic and the silica content is relatively high since the spring flows directly from lava flow deposits. The spring water can be classified as near-neutral sodium chloride brine.

== Eruptions ==
Babuyan Claro has one confirmed historical eruption: in 1860. Eruptions on Babuyan Claro is determined as probably strombolian or phreatomagmatic by the Philippine Institute of Volcanology and Seismology.

Three eruptions were originally attributed to Babuyan Claro: in 1813, 1913, and 1917. Later research concluded there was no 1831 eruption at Babuyan Claro; changes in climate of that year were reattributed to an eruption of Zavaritski Caldera. The eruption on 1913 is listed as uncertain by the Global Volcanism Program of the Smithsonian Institution while the 1917 eruption is confirmed as an eruption of Smith Volcano.

== Recent reported activity ==
In July 1993, there were reports of earthquakes and alleged drying up of vegetation at the upper slopes and summit area of the volcano but volcanologists said the earthquakes were of tectonic in origin and there was no significant change in the volcanic activity.

In February 2004, there were reports of grayish steam clouds hovering above the summit but volcanologists from PHIVOLCS said the seismic swarm was of tectonic origin and the steaming activity was only wispy to weak.

== See also ==
- List of volcanoes in the Philippines
  - List of active volcanoes in the Philippines
  - List of potentially active volcanoes in the Philippines
  - List of inactive volcanoes in the Philippines
