= Central Mindanao University =

Public university in Bukidnon, Philippines

- Pamantasan ng Gitnang Mindanao (Filipino)
- CMU Seal
- Former names: Mailag Industrial School (1910–1918); Bukidnon Agricultural School (1918–1923); Bukidnon Rural High School (1923–1928); Bukidnon Agricultural High School (1928–1938); Bukidnon National Agricultural School (1938–1952); Mindanao Agricultural College (1952–1965)
- Motto: The Academic Paradise of the South; Top Agricultural University in Mindanao
- Type: State university
- Established: 1910
- Academic affiliations: PASUC, MASCUF, Accrediting Agency for Chartered Colleges and Universities of the Philippines, Asian Association of Agricultural Colleges and Universities
- President: Prof. Rolito G. Eballe, PhD
- Vice-president: Prof. Jose S. Valmorida, PhD (Academic Affairs); Prof. Hermie P. Pava, MPoSc, PA(Res) (Administration); Prof. Alan P. Dargantes, DVM, PhD (Research, Development and Extension); Prof. Reynaldo L. Intong, PhD (Resource Generation and Management)
- Faculty: 500
- Administrative staff: 800
- Students: 12,000+
- Location: University Town, Musuan, Dologon, Maramag, Bukidnon, Philippines; 7°51′53″N 125°3′3″E
- Colors: Forest Green Maize Yellow
- Nickname: CMU Bulls
- Website: www.cmu.edu.ph
- Location in Mindanao Location in the Philippines

Central Mindanao University (CMU; Filipino: Pamantasan ng Gitnang Mindanao) is a research state university located in the heart of Mindanao Island, province of Bukidnon, Philippines. Founded in 1910, it is one of the oldest premier universities in the southern Philippines. CMU is recognized by the Commission on Higher Education (Philippines) as the Center of Excellence in the field of Agriculture, Forestry, Veterinary Medicine and Biology; and Center of Development in Mathematics, Environmental Science and Teacher Education. In 2017, CMU became the first higher education institution in Mindanao to be awarded with Institutional Accreditation (Level II) by the Accrediting Agency of Chartered Colleges and Universities in the Philippines.

== History ==
Central Mindanao University was transformed from a settlement of farm schools organized by the Americans. It started as the Mailag Industrial School in 1910 and offered only the first four grades of the elementary agriculture curriculum. Situated in Mailag, Malaybalay, Bukidnon, this school was opened to address the necessity of training Bukidnons to teach in their own province as it was difficult to recruit non-Bukidnon teachers to serve in newly opened public schools.

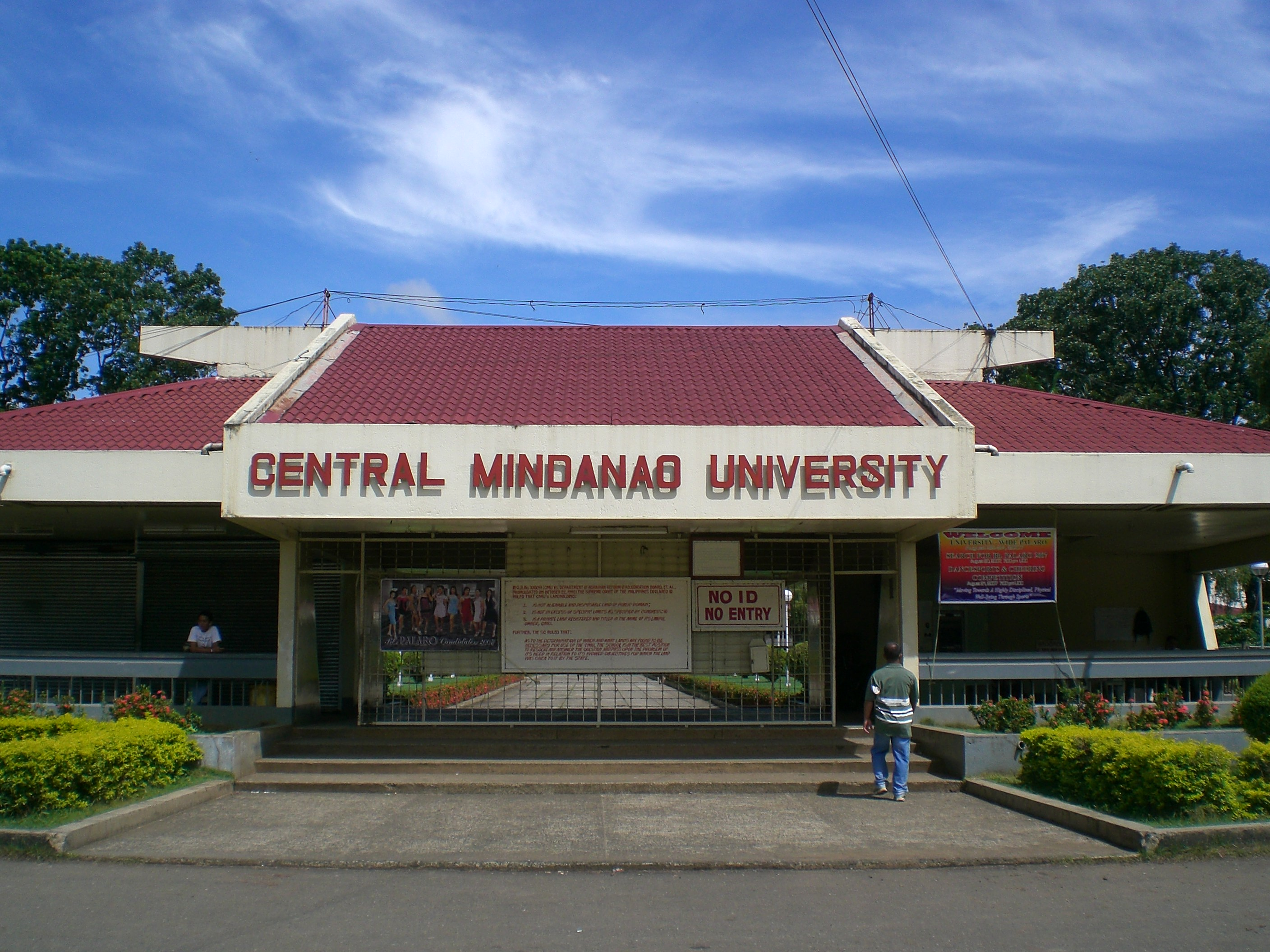
CMU Entrance Gate

In 1918, the school was renamed the Bukidnon Agricultural School and offered the last three grades of the elementary agriculture curriculum. This was later relocated to Managok, Malaybalay, Bukidnon. After a few years it offered the secondary agriculture curriculum. By 1923, the Governor General renamed the school to the Bukidnon Rural High School and allocated 724 hectares for the school's reservation by virtue of Proclamation No. 30.

In 1928, the Philippine Legislature changed the named of the school to Bukidnon Agricultural High School, which was then a secondary agricultural school for male students. In 1938, it was renamed the Bukidnon National Agricultural School which implemented the secondary homemaking curriculum for female students.

After the war, Superintendent Zosimo Montemayor reopened the school but due to its terrible condition caused by World War II, the school was transferred to Musuan, Maramag, Bukidnon, Philippines

Congressman Cesar Fortich of Bukidnon sponsored House Bill 3041, which elevated BNAS into an agricultural state college. On June 21, 1952, President Elpidio Quirino signed Republic Act 807, otherwise known as the Mindanao Agricultural College (MAC) Charter which also installed Zosimo Montemayor as president. This law also paved the way for funding from national, as well as foreign sources. From 1957 to 1960, three Stanford consultants, namely James Wall, Donald Green and John McCleland, lived in the locality and provided technical assistance in agricultural technology.

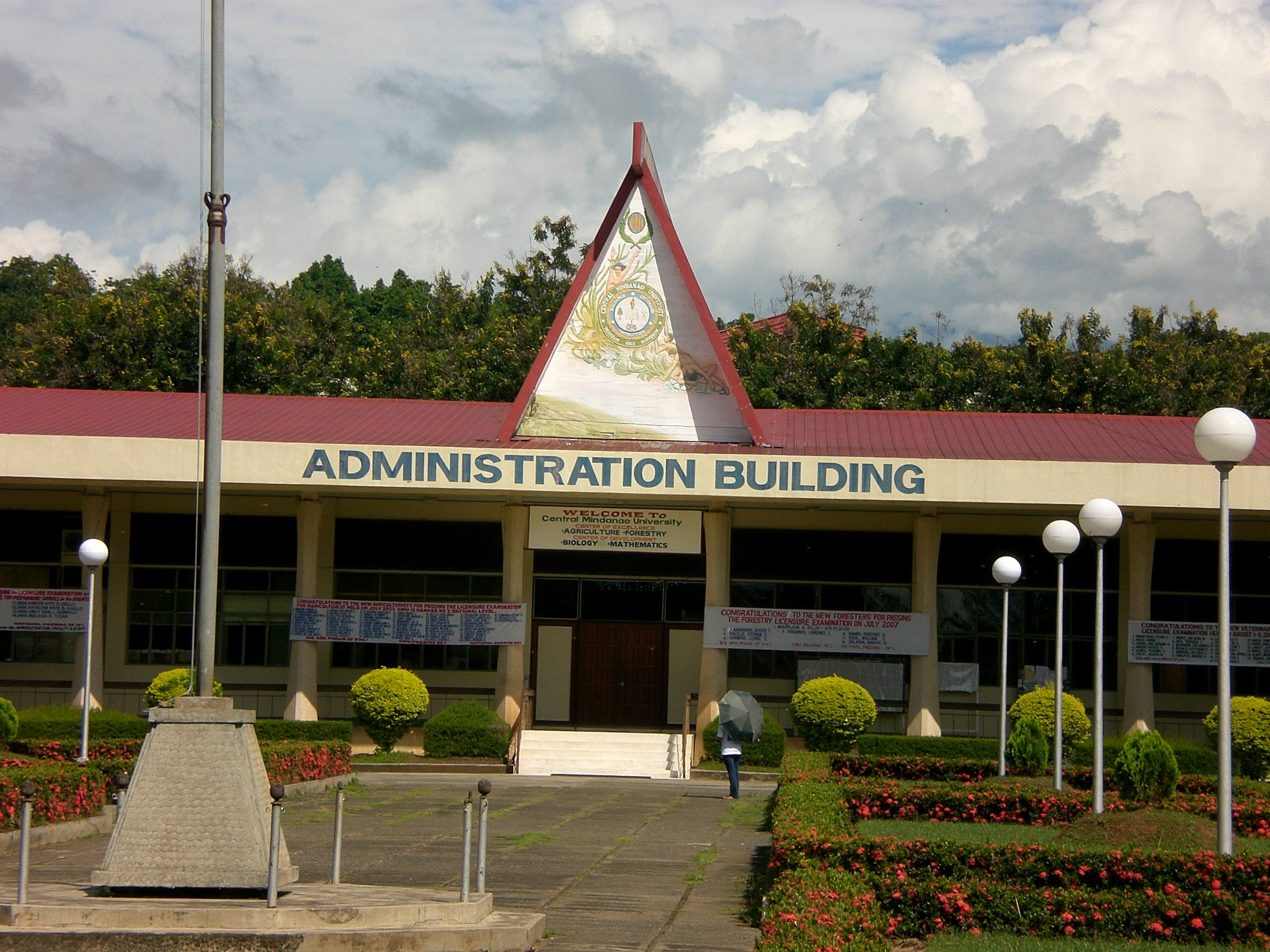
CMU Administration Building.

In 1958, President Carlos Garcia, on recommendation of the Secretary of Agriculture and Natural Resources, issued Proclamation No. 476 granting CMU 3,401 hectares of land. The titling of land began as early as 1961 before the Court of First Instance of Bukidnon to determine the rights of adverse claimants, if there were any. By June 19, 1965, R.A. 4498 catapulted MAC to the Central Mindanao University with Montemayor as the first President.

In 1974, the 1971 Cadastral Court decision for the segregation of several hectares was amended for humanitarian reason and the government's agrarian program. The 321.9 hectares were properly segregated and given to legitimate claimants and CMU was granted title for 3,080 hectares.

The current CMU president is Dr. Rolito G. Eballe. He previously served as the Dean of the College of Arts and Sciences, He is the ninth CMU president. The former CMU presidents are Dr. Amado Campos, Dr. Isabelo S. Alcordo, Dr. Rodolfo Nayga, Dr. Leonardo Chua, Dr. Jaime Gellor, and Dr. Mardonio M. Lao.

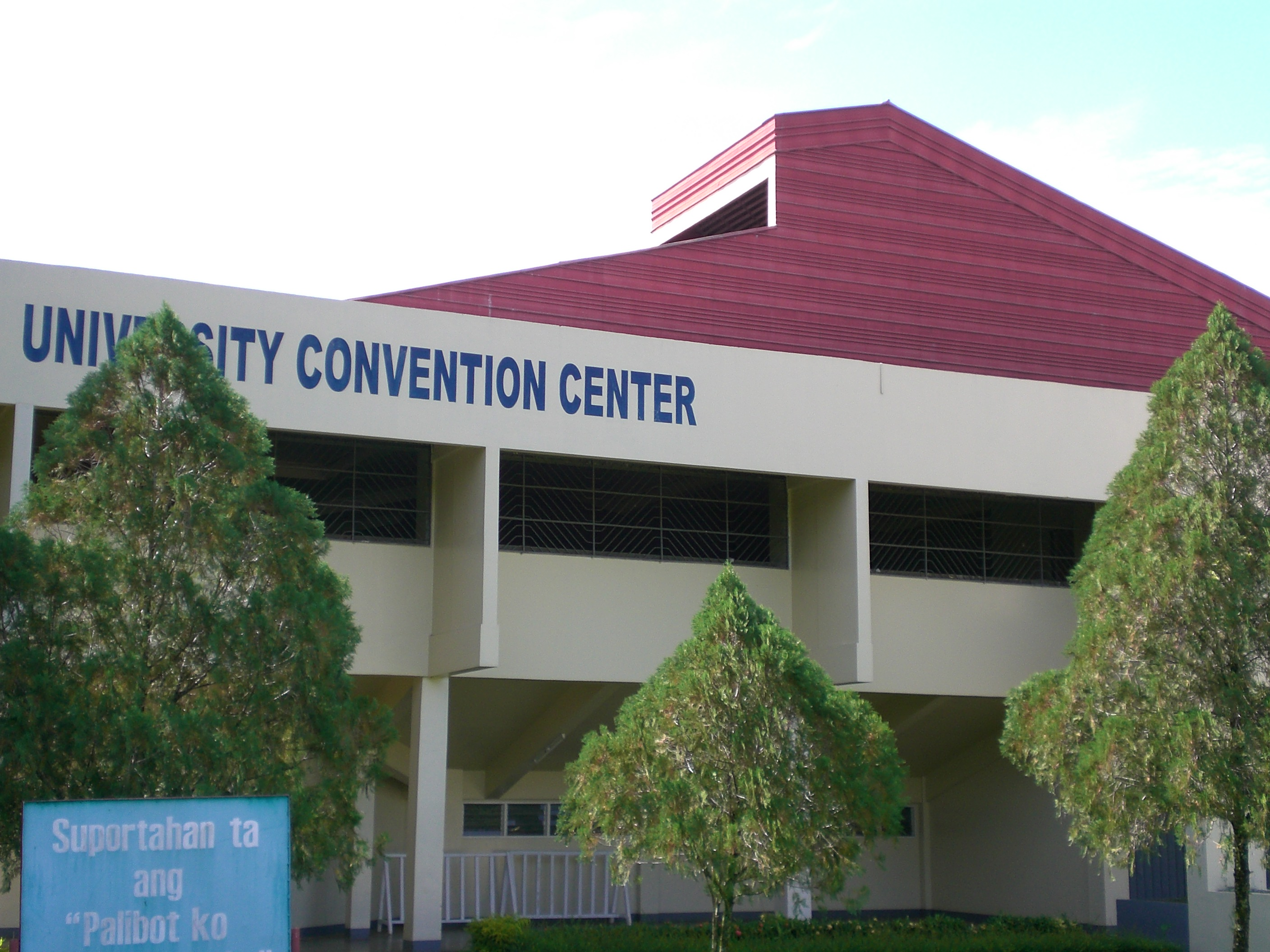
CMU University Convention Center

== Academic Journal ==
CMU Journal of Science is the official academic journal with ISSN Print: 0116-7847 ISSN Online: 2704-3703. With category B accreditation from The Philippine Commission on Higher Education indexed by The Philippine E-journals.

== Media ==
=== Radio ===
The university has its own radio station called 88.9 Development Radio (DXMU 88.9 MHz), which have been broadcasting since 2007. Its studios are located at the Research and Extension Complex inside the Campus, and its transmitter is located at Mount Musuan, Maramag, Bukidnon.

DXMU before in AM band had been in operation by late 1970s; its frequency was moved in 1978 from 1430 kHz to 1422 kHz. Sometime, the station's power was decreased from 5 kW to 1 kW (by mid-1990s). The Department of Agriculture later funded the station's rehabilitation and its eventual conversion from AM to FM in 2012, as well as its revival for use in information dissemination related to agriculture.

Meanwhile, CMU had its broadcast franchise for educational and noncommercial purposes granted through Republic Act No. 9044 in 2001.

== See also ==
- Central Mindanao University Laboratory High School
