= Biliran (volcano) =

Volcano in the Philippines

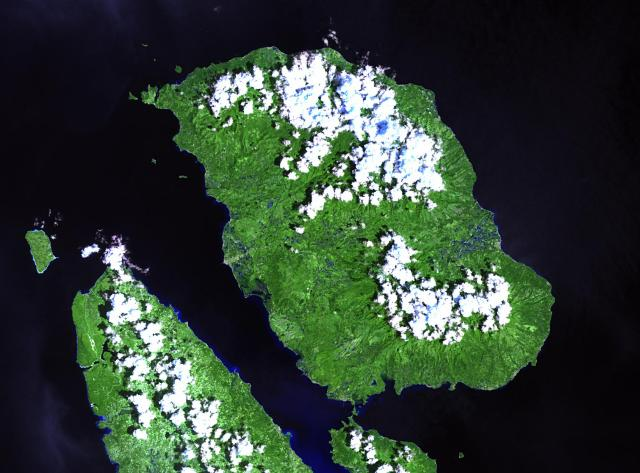

Highest point
- Elevation: 1,340 m (4,400 ft)
- Prominence: 199 m (653 ft)
- Coordinates: 11°39′00″N 124°32′06″E

Geography
- Location within Philippines
- Location: Biliran province, Eastern Visayas region, Visayas island group, Philippines

Geology
- Rock age: Quaternary
- Mountain type: Complex volcano
- Last eruption: September 26, 1939

Mount Biliran is a solfataric active complex volcano located in the island province of Biliran in the Philippines. The volcano caused the formation of the island.

== Geological features ==
- Rock Type: Hornblende andesite containing greenish and black hornblende
- Tectonic Setting: Biliran Volcano is part of the curvilinear belt of Quaternary volcanoes in eastern Philippines, parallel to Phil. Trench to the east

=== Volcanic activity ===
- Number of Historical Eruptions: 1
- Latest Eruption/Activity: September 26, 1939
- Site: crater
- Eruption Character: Debris avalanche
- Affected Areas/Remarks: Ashfall at Caibiran and adjoining areas (6.35 cm thick deposits)
- Monitoring activity: Short-term monitoring in 1954

=== Physical features ===
- Hotsprings:
  1. Central Biliran – Libtong Thermal Areas (12 hot springs and one bubbling pool)
  2. North Biliran – Panamao Thermal Area
  3. Anas Thermal Area
  4. South Biliran – Kalambis Thermal Area
- Adjacent Volcanic Edifice:
  1. Panamao (107 m asl)
  2. Gumansan (1064 m asl)
  3. Lauan (1187 m asl)
  4. Suiro (1301 m asl)

== See also ==
- List of volcanoes in the Philippines
  - List of active volcanoes in the Philippines
  - List of potentially active volcanoes in the Philippines
  - List of inactive volcanoes in the Philippines
- Philippine Institute of Volcanology and Seismology
