= Smith Volcano =

Active volcano in the Philippines

Calayan Volcano
- Mount Babuyan
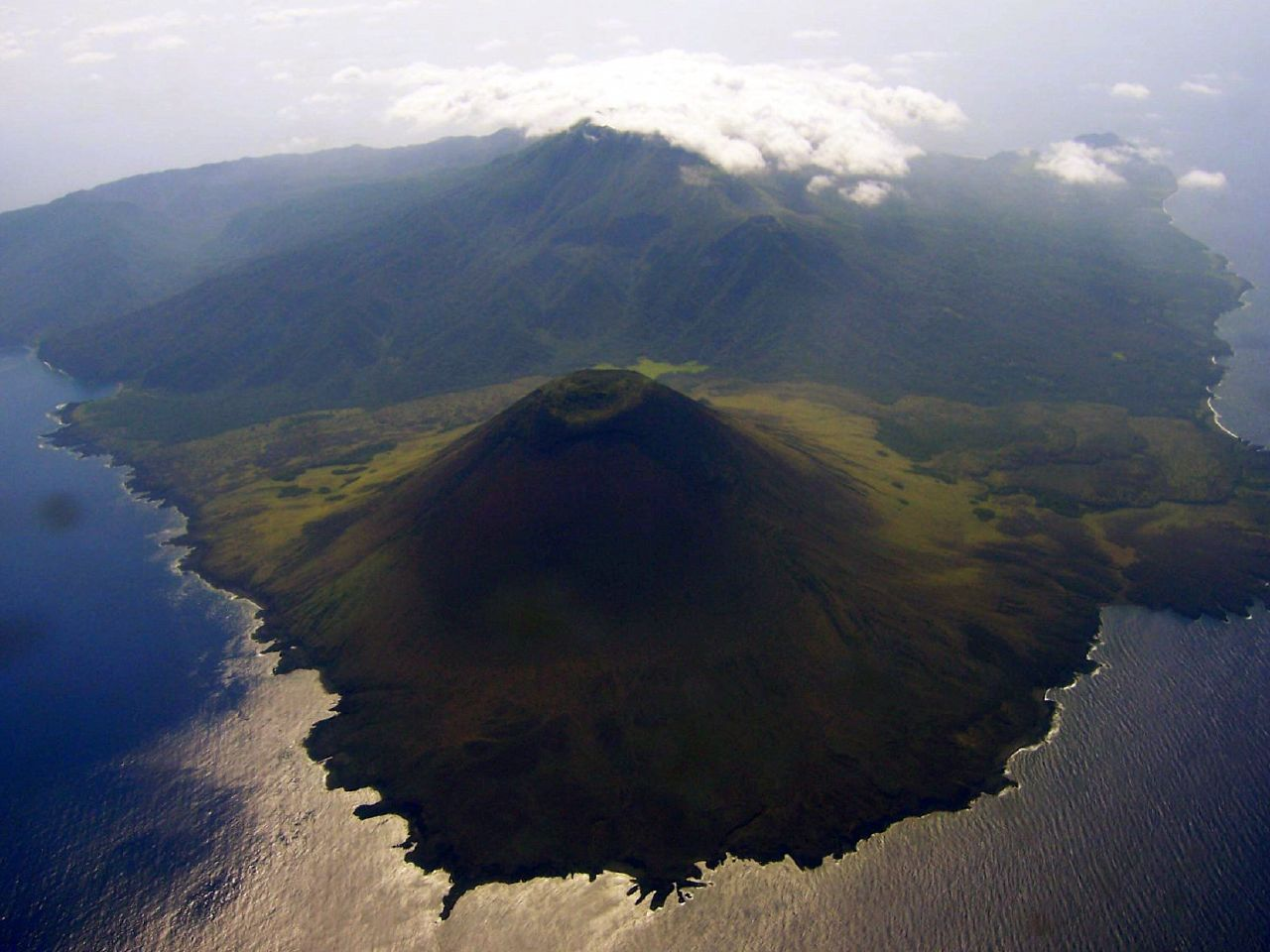
- Aerial view of Smith Volcano (foreground) on the western part of Babuyan Island with Babuyan Claro in the background

Highest point
- Elevation: 688 m (2,257 ft)
- Coordinates: 19°32′11.84″N 121°54′46.24″E

Geography
- Location within Philippines
- Location: Babuyan Islands
- Country: Philippines
- Region: Cagayan Valley
- Province: Cagayan
- Municipality: Calayan

Geology
- Mountain type: Cinder cone
- Volcanic arc: Luzon Volcanic Arc
- Last eruption: 1924

Smith Volcano, also known as Mount Babuyan, is a cinder cone on Babuyan Island, the northernmost of the Babuyan group of islands on Luzon Strait, north of the main island of Luzon in the Philippines. The mountain is one of the active volcanoes in the Philippines, which last erupted in 1924.

The volcano is politically located in the Municipality of Calayan, Cagayan province, the town that has jurisdiction over the Babuyan Islands except Fuga Island.

== Physical features ==
The sparsely-vegetated cinder cone is 688 meters (2,257 ft) high with a base diameter of 4.5 kilometers (2.8 mi). Layers of basaltic lava flows are evident south of the volcano.

Smith Volcano is one of the probably five Pleistocene-to-Holocene volcanic centers on Babuyan Island (also known as Babuyan de Claro Island) with Smith, the youngest volcano on the island. The largest on the island is Babuyan Claro (also known as Mt. Pangasun), an active stratovolcano with two well-preserved summit craters 300 and 400 m (980 and 1,310 ft) in diameter, located in the center of the island. Babuyan Claro is about 4.3 kilometers (2.7 mi) peak-to-peak southeast of Smith Volcano, which is the north-westernmost summit on the triangular-shaped island.

== Eruptions ==
Smith Volcano has erupted five times, the last of which was in 1924.

== Emergency investigation of 1993 ==
A team of volcanologists from the Philippine Institute of Volcanology and Seismology (PHIVOLCS) Quick Response Team conducted an investigation on July 8, 1993 following reports of unusual volcanic activity at Babuyan Island. Results of the survey showed that Smith Volcano was quiet with no volcanic earthquakes recorded during the survey.

== See also ==
- List of volcanoes in the Philippines
  - List of active volcanoes in the Philippines
  - List of potentially active volcanoes in the Philippines
  - List of inactive volcanoes in the Philippines
