= List of active volcanoes in the Philippines =

As of 2018, the Philippines has 24 volcanoes listed as active by the Philippine Institute of Volcanology and Seismology (PHIVOLCS). Twenty-one of these have had historical eruptions. The three exceptions are Cabalian, which is a strongly fumarolic volcano; Leonard Kniaseff, which was active 1,800 years ago (C14), and Isarog, which last erupted around 3500 BCE and 2374 BCE ± 87 based on radiocarbon dating.

Volcanoes in the country have erupted within the last 600 years, with accounts of these eruptions documented by humans; or have erupted within the last 10,000 years (Holocene). There are 100 volcanoes in the Philippines listed by the Smithsonian Institution's Global Volcanism Program (GVP) at present, of which 20 are categorized as "historical" and 59 as "Holocene". The GVP lists volcanoes with historical, Holocene eruptions, or possibly older if strong signs of volcanism are still evident through thermal features like fumaroles, hot springs, mud pots, etc.

== List of volcanoes ==
The list below showing 27 active volcanoes in the Philippines was based on the PHIVOLCS list with some included from the GVP. The number is not definite and depends on someone's definition of "active" or historical time frame. Descriptions under "eruptions" were based on the GVP website. The frequency of historical eruptions excludes questionable or uncertain accounts based on the two sources mentioned.

Name	Elevation (ASL)		Coordinates	Province(s)	Eruptions	
Name	m	ft	Coordinates	Province(s)		Description and current status
Ambalatungan Group	2,329	7,641	17°18′40″N 121°06′13″E	Kalinga	0	Explosions in 1952 is uncertain. Fumarolic with solfataras and thermal springs.
Babuyan Claro	843	2,766	19°31′23″N 121°56′24″E	Cagayan	3	Eruptions were recorded in 1860 and 1913. Askedna Hot Springs is in the southern base of the volcano.
Banahaw	2,169	7,116	14°04′N 121°29′E	Laguna, Quezon	4	Eruptions were uncertain during the mudflows of 1730, 1743, 1843 and 1909.
Biliran	1,340	4,400	11°33′29″N 124°30′47″E	Biliran	1	Phreatic eruption in 1939. Fumarolic with thermal springs
Bulusan	1,565	5,135	12°46′12″N 124°03′00″E	Sorsogon	18	Eruptions years are from 1886 to 2025. Permanently monitored
Cabalian	945	3,100	10°17′13.2″N 125°13.25′0″E	Southern Leyte	1	Radiocarbon dating on a pyroclastic flow deposit from the volcano estimated that the last eruption was in 1820
Cagua	1,160	3,810	18°13′19″N 122°07′23″E	Cagayan	1	Eruption in 1860 and strong solfataric activity in 1907. Thermal areas are near the summit and NW to NNE flanks.
Camiguin de Babuyanes	712	2,336	18°49′48″N 121°51′36″E	Cagayan	1	Its only recorded eruption was in 1857. Fumarolic with thermal springs
Didicas	843	2,766	19°04′37″N 122°12′07″E	Cagayan	6	Eruptions in 1773, 1856, 1900, 1952, 1969 and 1978. A submarine volcano till 1952 when a permanent island was formed.
Hibok‑Hibok	1,332	4,370	9°12′11″N 124°40′23″E	Camiguin	5	Eruption in years 1827, 1862, 1871 and 1948–1952. Activity from 1897–1902 was only solfataric. Permanently monitored.
Iraya	1,009	3,310	20°28′08″N 122°00′36″E	Batanes	1	Last eruption was in 1454. Seismic swarm in 1998.
Isarog	1,143	3,750	13°39′29″N 123°22′48″E	Camarines Sur	2	The last eruption was around 3500 BCE ± 125 years and 2374 BCE ± 87 years based on radiocarbon dating.
Jolo Group	620	2,030	6.013°N 121.057°E	Sulu	0	Uncertain submarine eruption in 1897. Listed as Bud Dajo, a cinder cone on Jolo Island, in the PHIVOLCS list.
Kanlaon	2,435	7,989	10°24′43″N 123°07′55″E	Negros Occidental, Negros Oriental	30	Eruptions were recorded from 1886 to 2006. On November 23, 2015, the volcano had a small, steam-driven explosion. PHIVOLCS raised the alert level to 1 (mild restiveness). Last eruption was on May 13, 2025, at 02:55 AM PST which PHIVOLCS classified as moderately explosive eruption. Kanlaon generated a greyish voluminous plume that rose approximately 4.5 kilometers above the vent. Pyroclastic Density Currents (PDCs) also descended about 2 kilometers from the crater.
Leonard Kniaseff	200	660	7°22′55″N 126°02′49″E	Davao de Oro	0	Last eruption was dated as c.120 AD. Strong thermal features.
Makaturing	1,940	6,360	7°38′49″N 124°19′12″E	Lanao del Sur	2	Eruption recorded in 1865 and 1882. The 1856 and 1858 eruptions was credited to Ragang
Matutum	2,286	7,500	6°22′N 125°04′E	South Cotabato	0	Mountain was fumarolic on March 7, 1911, but if an eruption occurred was uncertain. Thermal springs in Akmoan and Linan.
Mayon	2,460	8,070	13°15′25″N 123°41′06″E	Albay	54	Eruptions were recorded from 1616 to 2026. Permanently monitored. Most recent volcanic activity occurred in 2026.
Mélébingóy	1,784	5,853	6°06′47″N 124°53′31″E	South Cotabato	1	A caldera-forming eruption occurred on January 4, 1641.
Musuan	646	2,119	7°52′37″N 125°04′05″E	Bukidnon	2	Eruptions in 1866 & 1867. Strong seismic swarm in 1976.
Pinatubo	1,445	4,741	15°08′N 120°21′E	Zambales, Tarlac, Pampanga	4	Reawakened in 1991, producing the 2nd largest eruption in the 20th century. Followed by milder eruptions in 1992 and 1993. Also minor additional activities in 2021. Permanently monitored.
Ragang	2,815	9,236	7°42′N 124°30′E	Lanao del Sur, Cotabato	7	Eruption years are from 1765 to 1873. Eruptions were uncertain in 1915 and 1916.
San Pablo Volcanic Field	1,090	3,580	14°07′N 121°18′E	Laguna, Batangas	1	Last activity was the formation of Sampaloc Lake around 1350 AD +/- 100 years determined by anthropology
Smith	688	2,257	19°32′02″N 121°55′01″E	Cagayan	6	Eruption years are from 1652 and 1907 to 1924. Combined with Babuyan Claro on the GVP list.
Taal	311	1,020	14°00′07″N 120°59′35″E	Batangas	39	Previous eruption years are from 1572 to 1977. Permanently monitored.

== Gallery ==
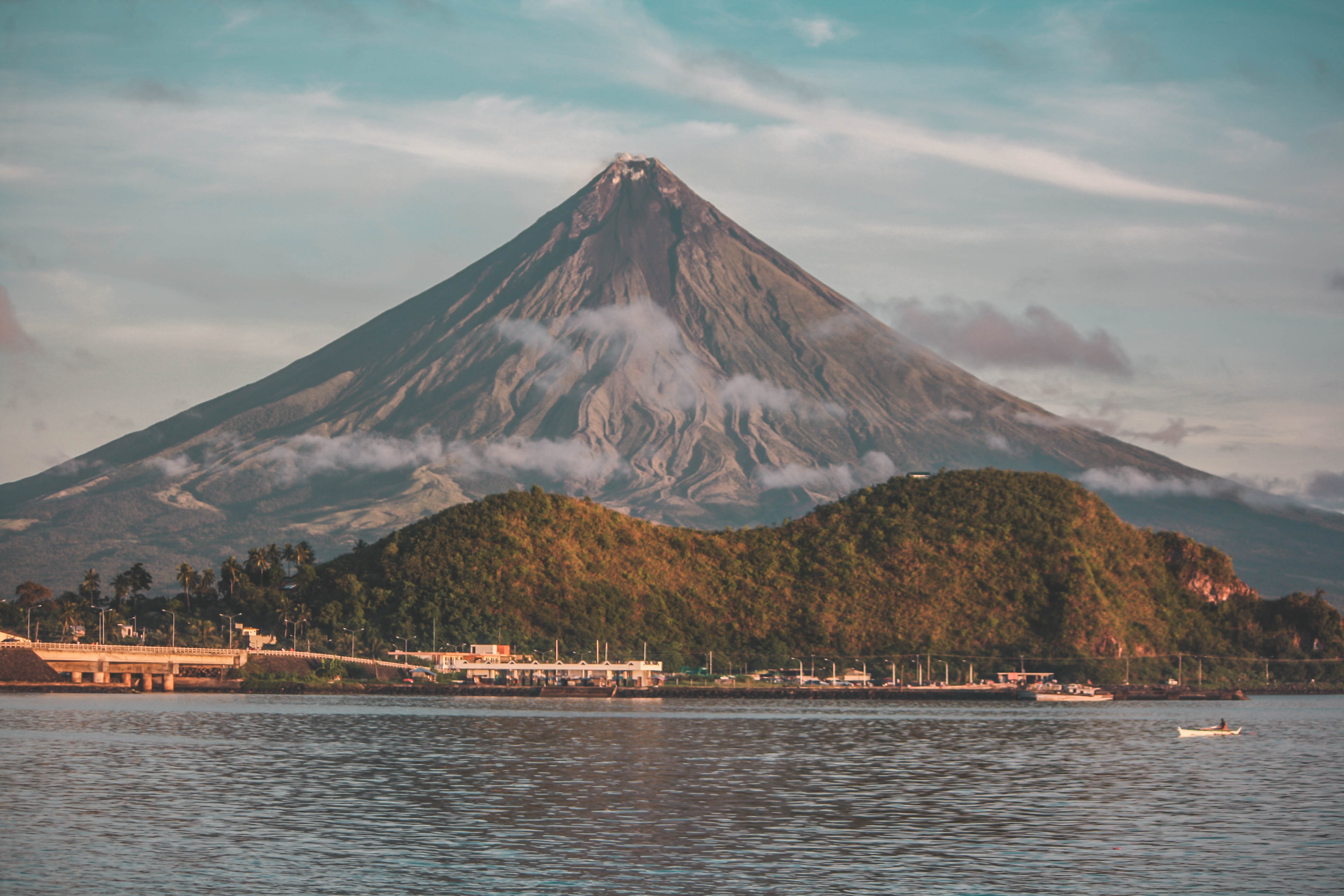
Mount Mayon in Albay is the most active volcano in the Philippines

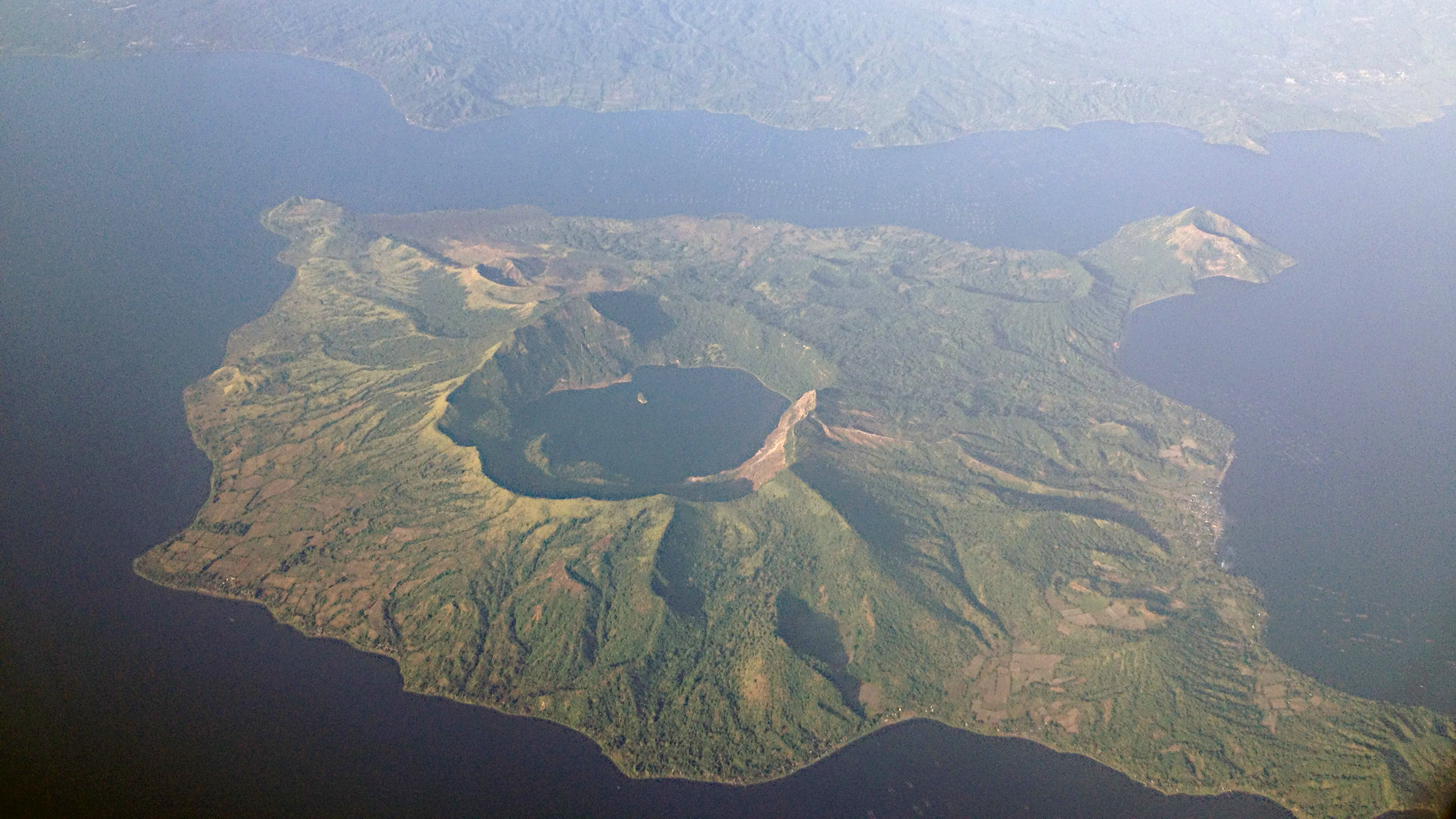
Taal in Batangas is the second most active volcano in the Philippines

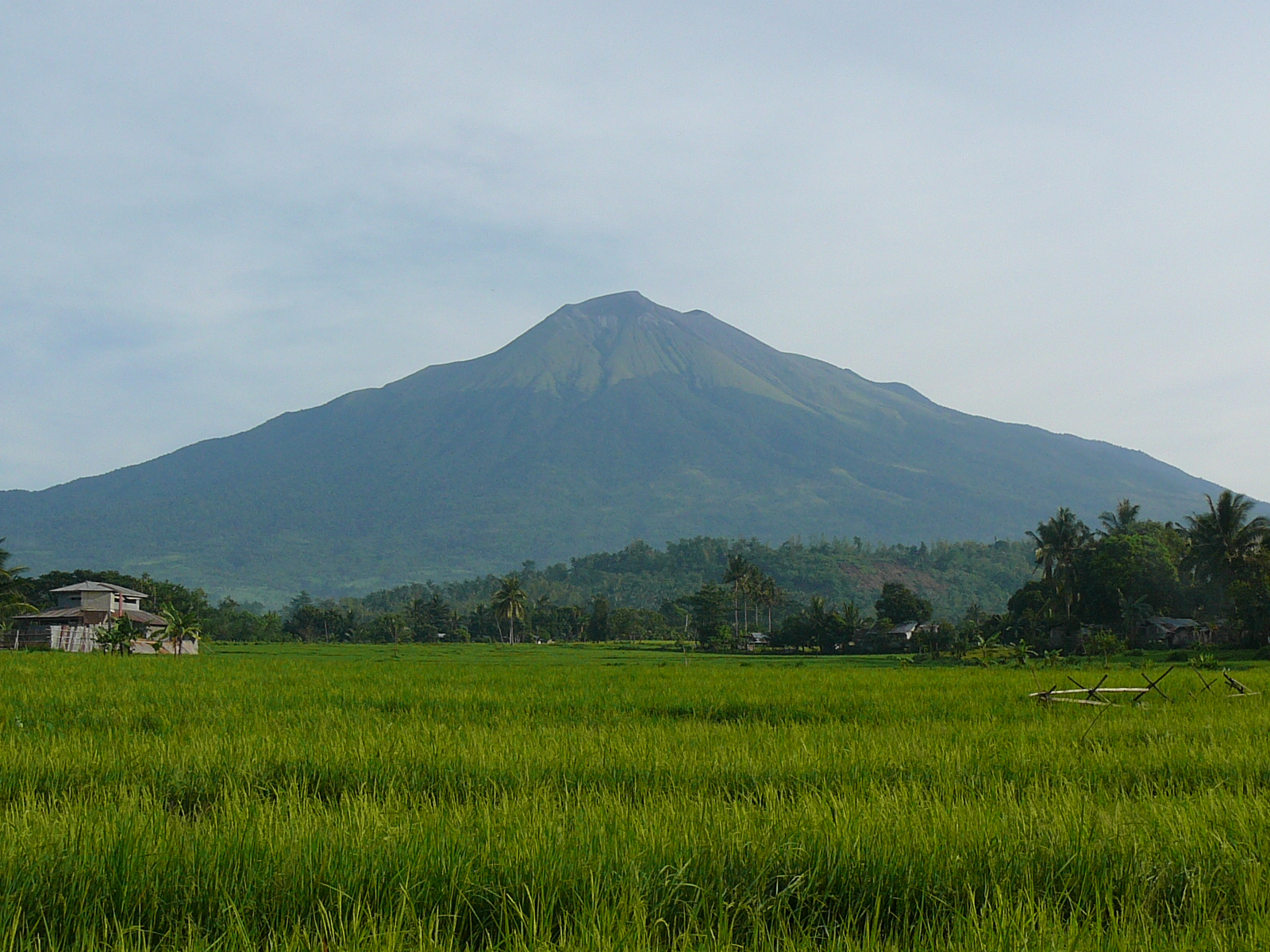
Kanlaon in Negros island

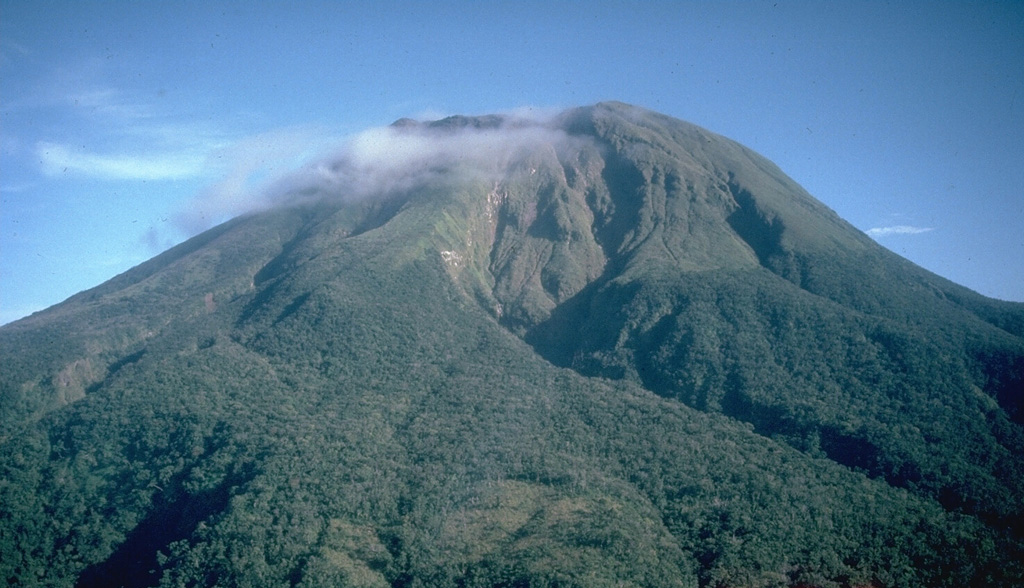
Bulusan in Sorsogon

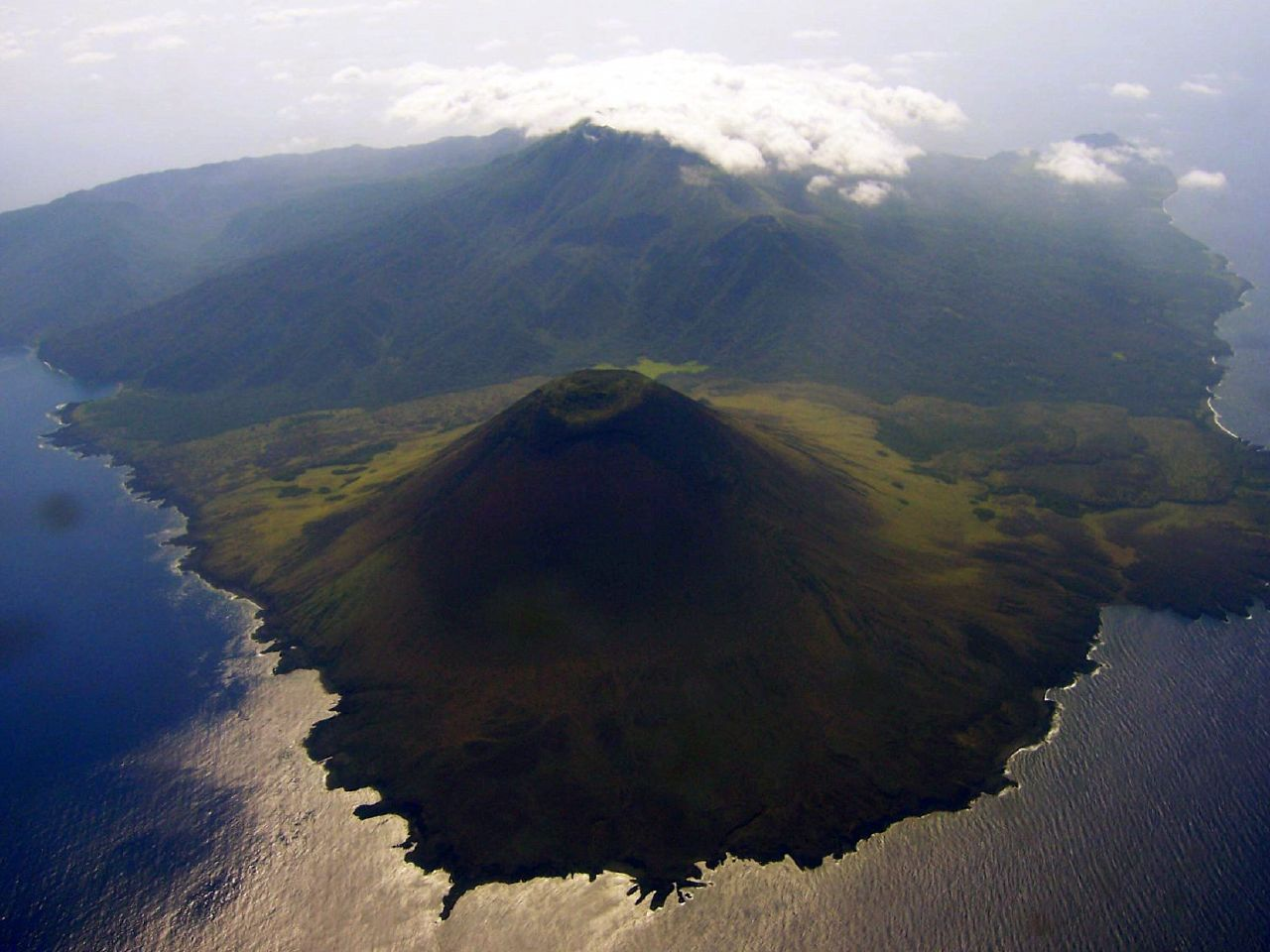
Smith in Calayan

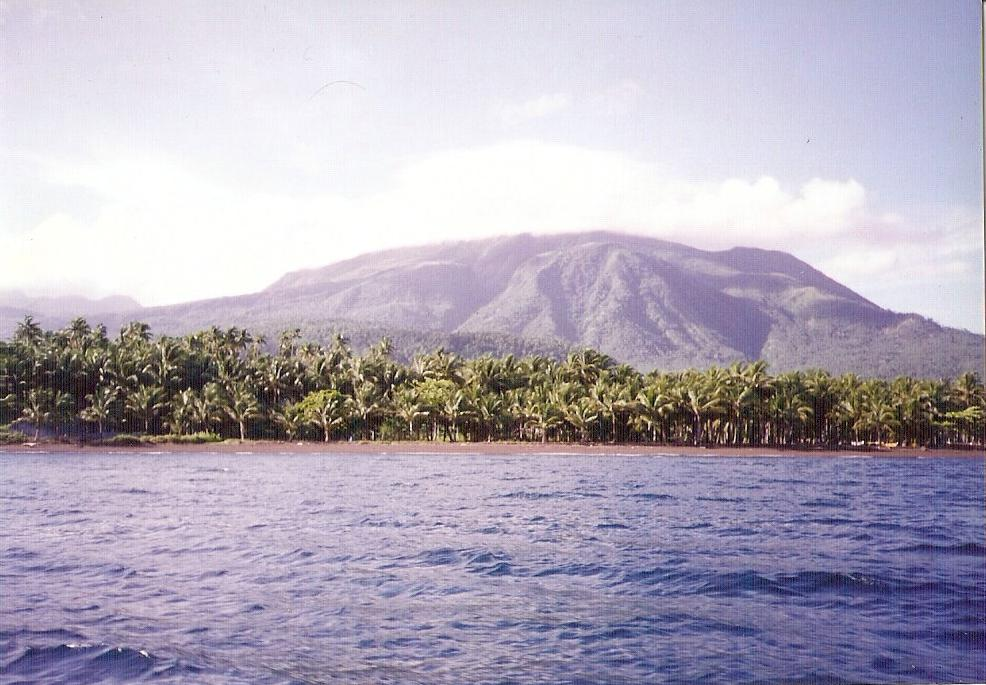
Hibok‑Hibok in Camiguin

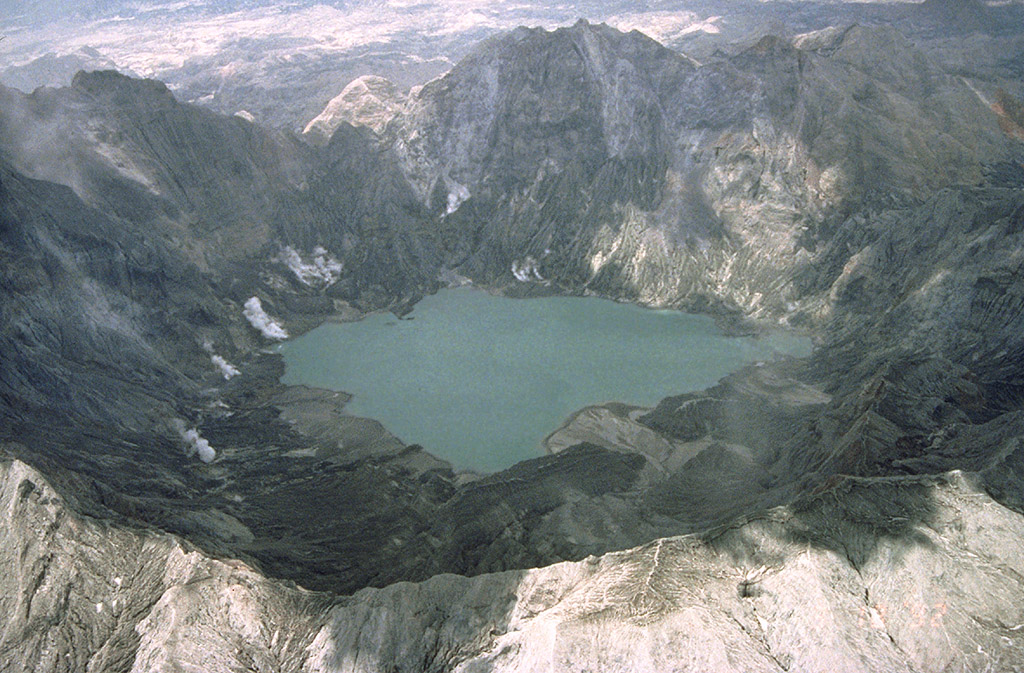
Pinatubo in Zambales

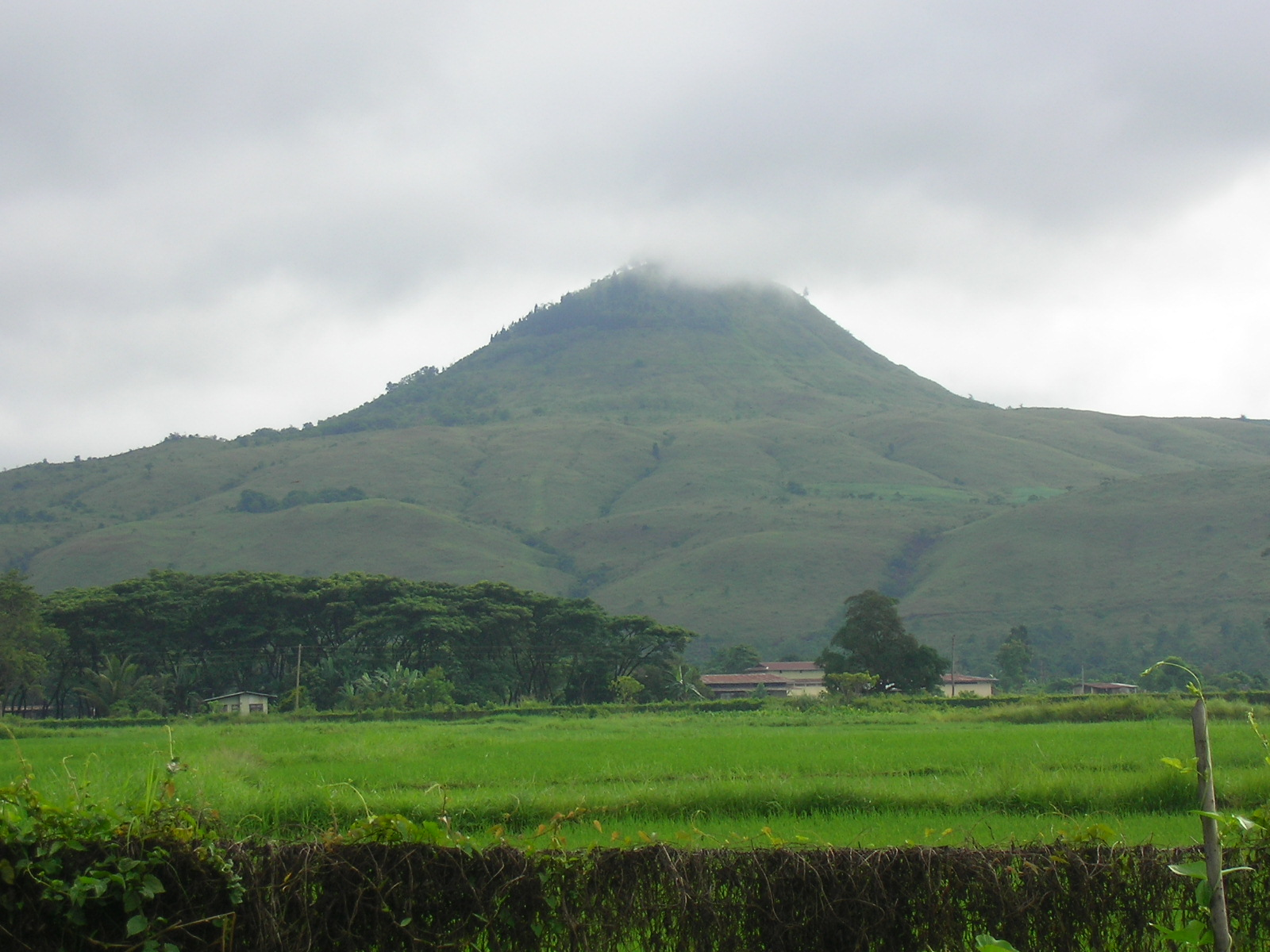
Musuan in Bukidnon

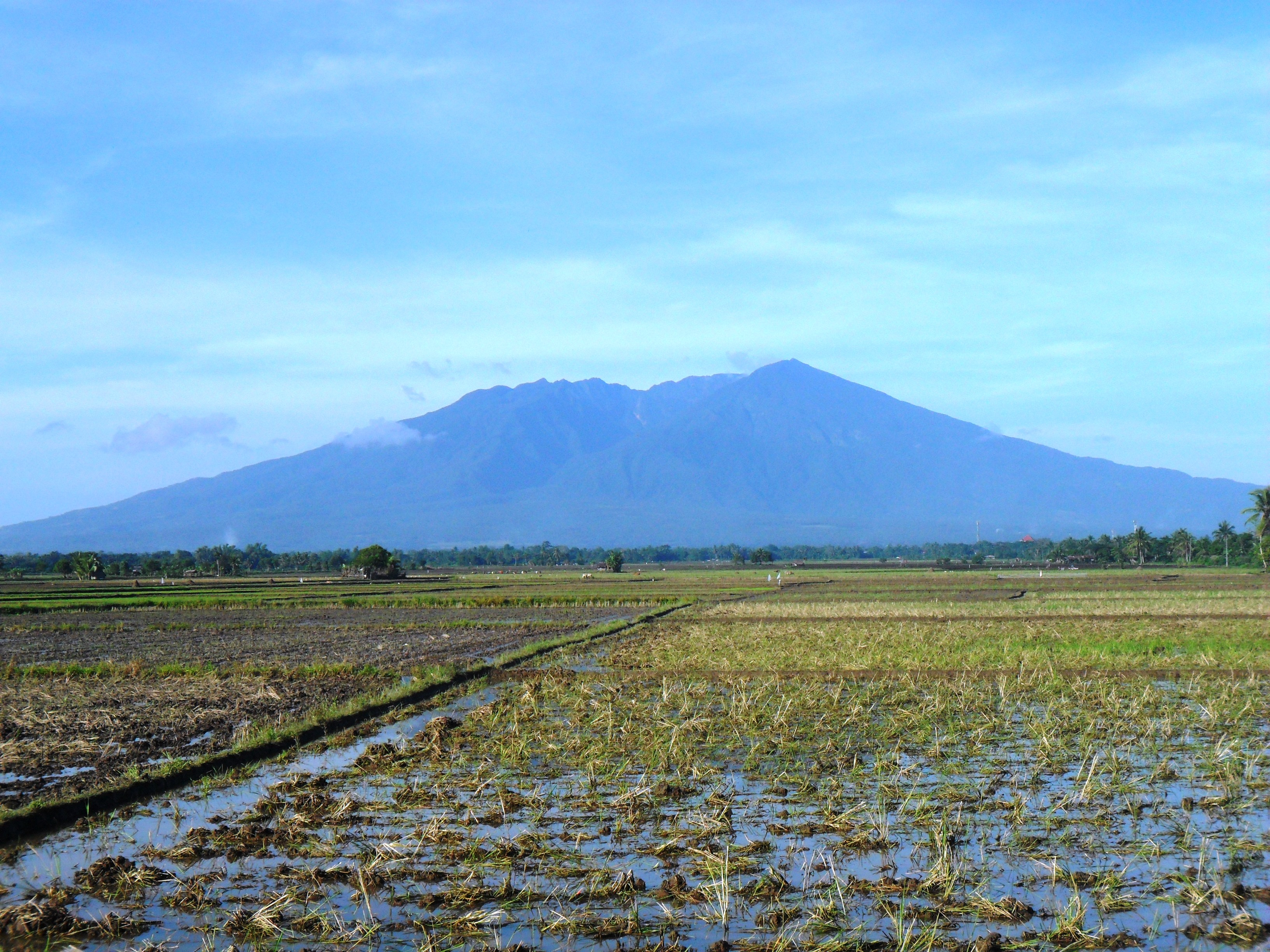
Mount Isarog in Camarines Sur

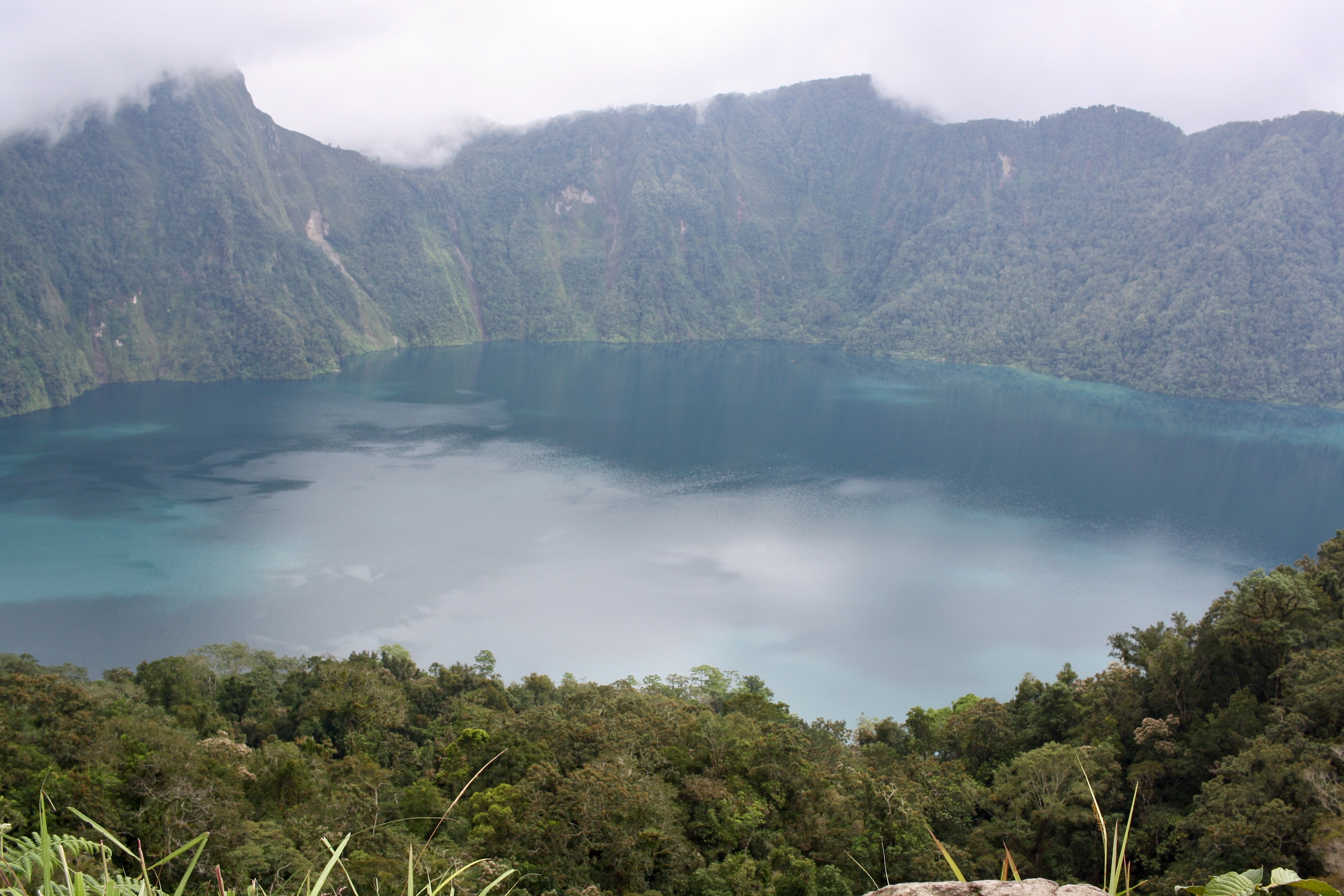
Mount Melibengoy and its crater lake in South Cotabato

== See also ==
- List of potentially active volcanoes in the Philippines
- List of inactive volcanoes in the Philippines
- List of mountains in the Philippines
