= Mount Melibengoy =

Active volcano on Mindanao island in the Philippines

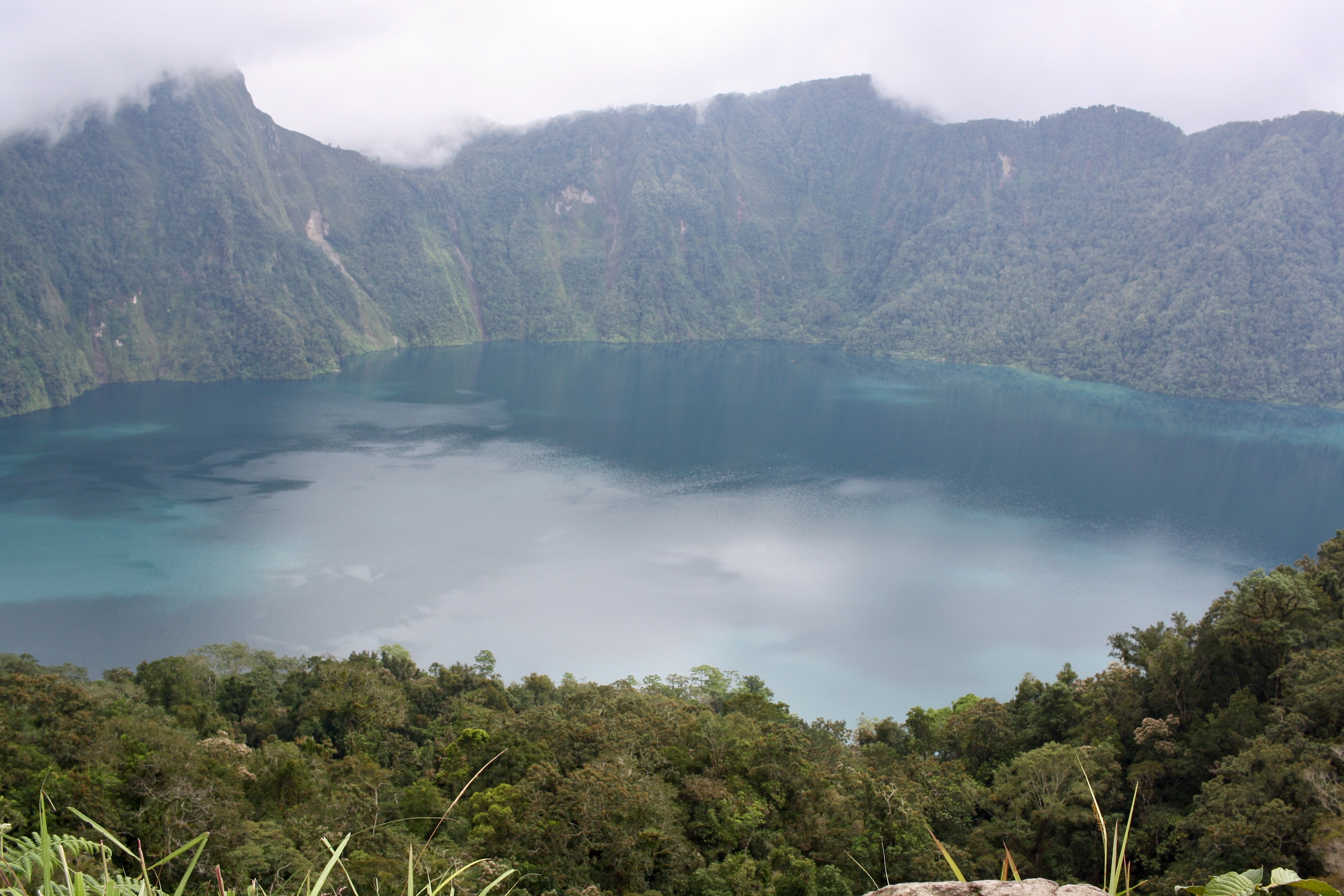
- Lake Maughan or commonly known as Lake Holon (crater lake of Mount Melibengoy)

Highest point
- Elevation: 1,824 m (5,984 ft)
- Listing: Active volcano
- Coordinates: 6°06′48″N 124°53′30″E

Geography
- Location within Philippines
- Location: Mindanao
- Country: Philippines
- Region: Soccsksargen
- Province: South Cotabato
- Municipality: Tboli

Geology
- Mountain type: Stratovolcano
- Last eruption: 1640 to 1641

Mount Melibengoy, formerly known as Parker Volcano, is an active volcano on Mindanao island in the Philippines. It is located in the province of South Cotabato, 30 km (19 mi) west of General Santos and 44 km (27 mi) south of Koronadal.

The volcano's English name is taken from an American, General Frank Parker, who spotted the mountain and claimed to have "discovered" it during a flight he piloted in 1934. Parker led an expedition up to the lake in the mountain's crater with other US colonial and Filipino government officials, including Vice-Governor-General Joseph Ralston Hayden and Provincial Governor Gutierrez, in the fall of 1934.

== Physical features ==
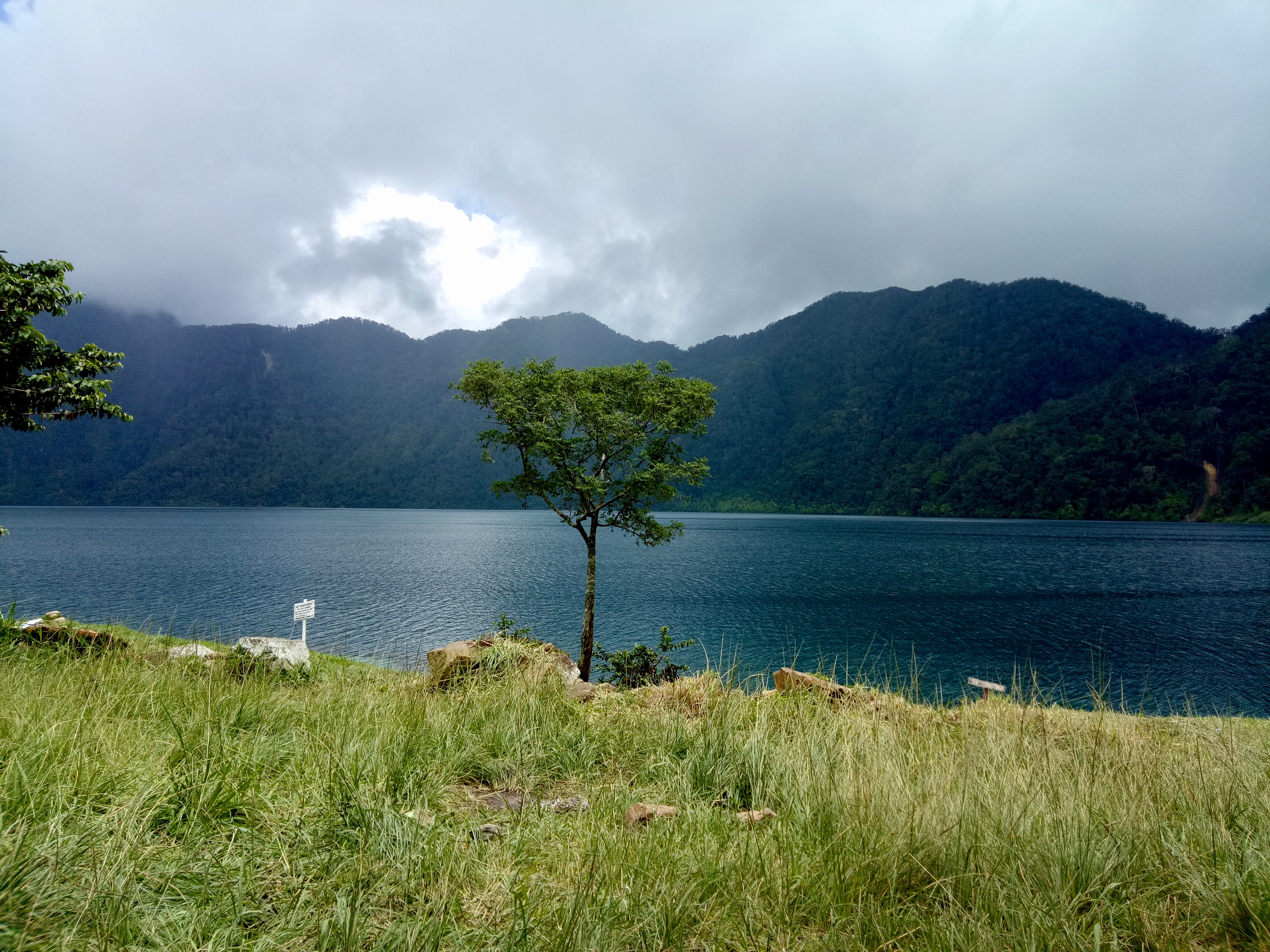
Lake Maughan (Lake Holon)

The elevation is given as 1,784 metres (5,853 ft) by some sources and as 1,824 metres (5,984 ft) by others. The volcano has a base diameter of 40 kilometres (25 mi). It has a 2.9-kilometre (1.8 mi) wide caldera with steep walls that rise 200-500m above the lake that is now called Lake Maughan. The lake, which is commonly called Lake Holon, was named after another American who was with Parker when he crashed.

Melibengoy is considered one of the sacred places of the T'boli tribe. It hosts a rare species, Parantica dannatti reyesi, a butterfly related to the monarch, which was discovered by the late Professor Josue de los Reyes of Notre Dame of Marbel University and published in the entomological journal of Senckerburg Research Institute in December 1994.

Government officials have also confirmed sightings of the Philippine tarsier, Tarsius syrichta, which can supposedly be found in the barangays surrounding Lake Holon.

== Eruptions ==
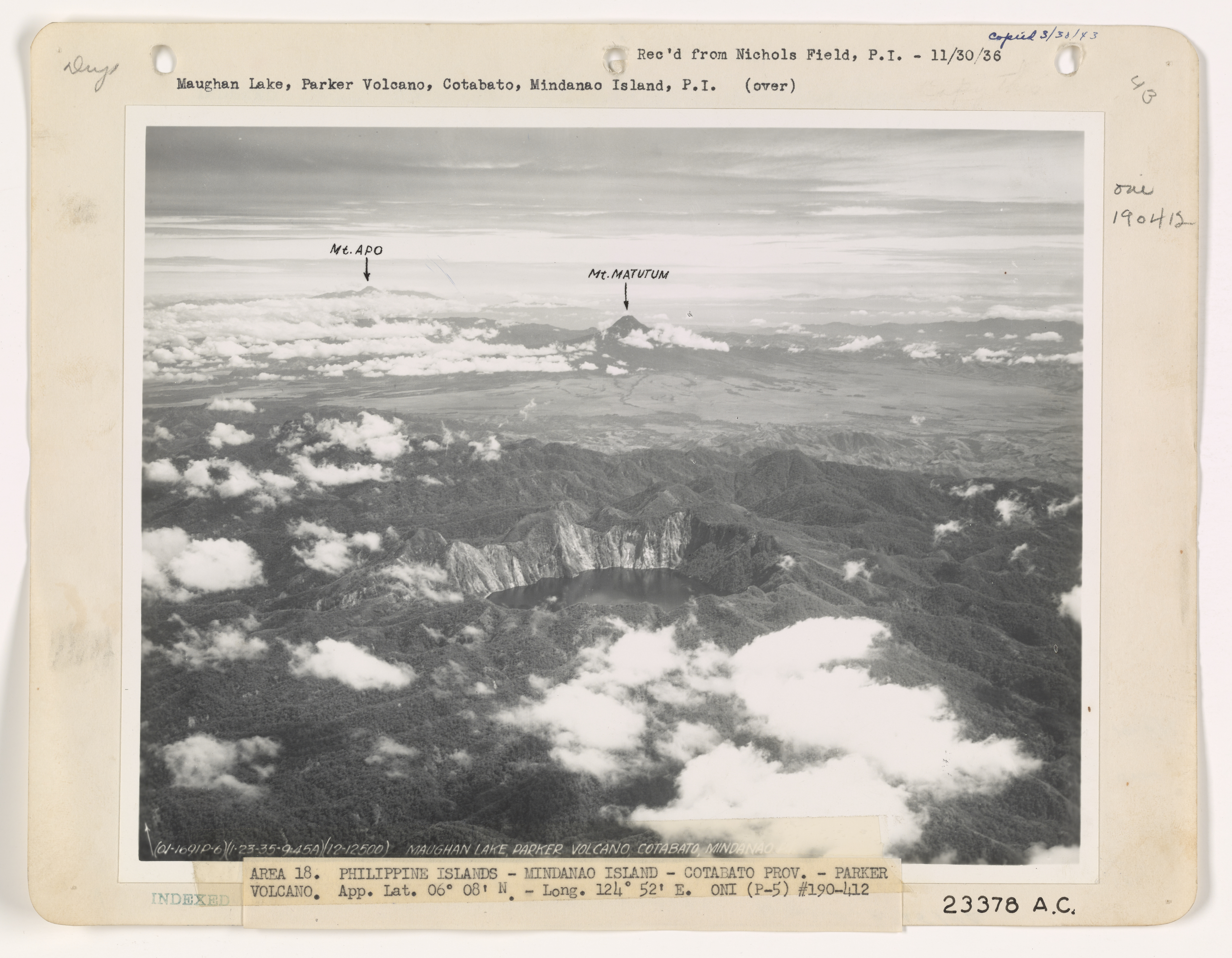
Aerial view of Lake Maughan, Parker Volcano, 1936

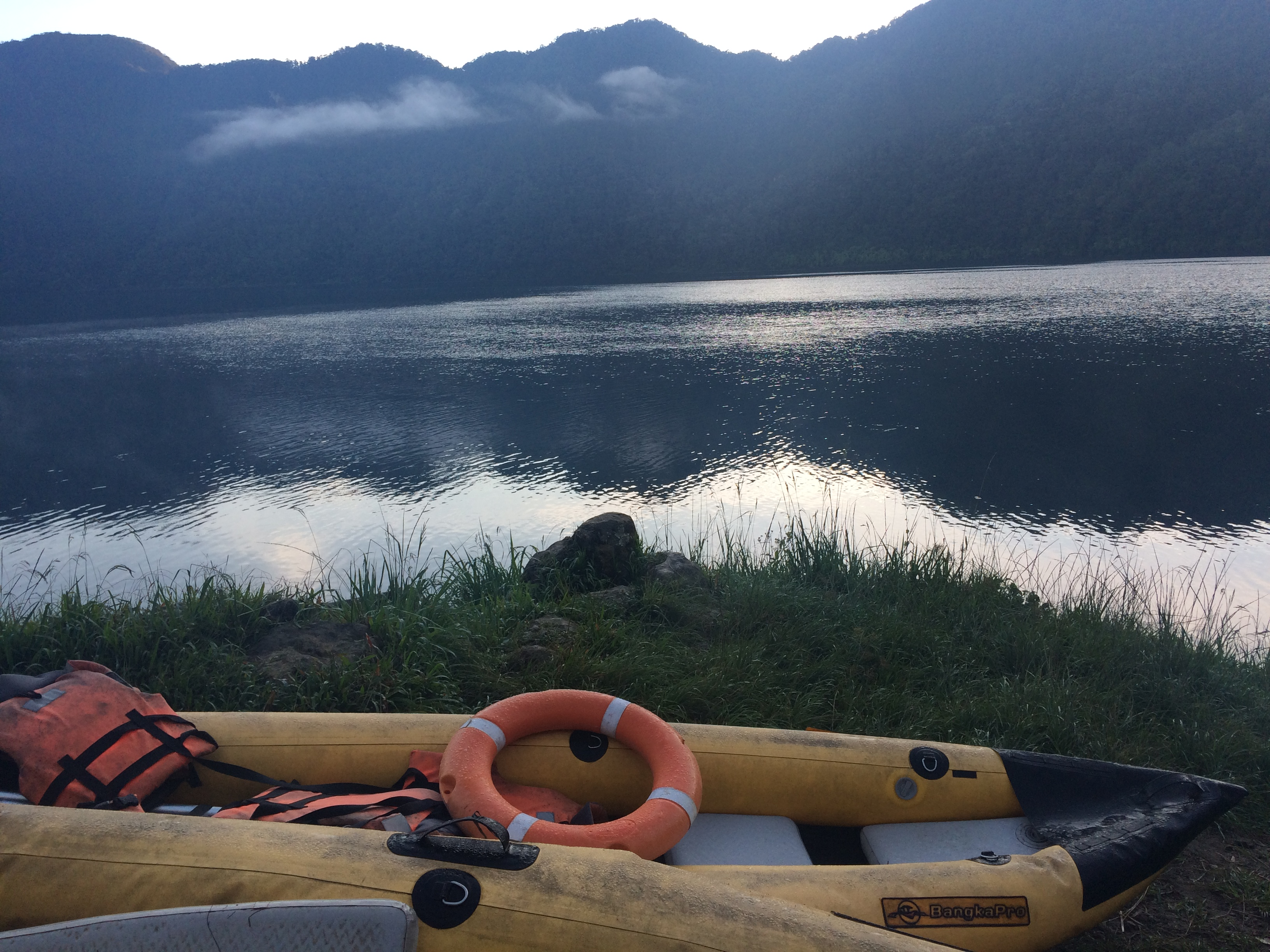
Lake Holon view

Mount Melibengoy is believed to have erupted thrice over the past 3,800 years, the last one on January 4, 1641. The 1641 eruption caused the formation of the crater lake. It also led to the collapse of the Ming Dynasty in China in 1644 by exacerbating an already multi year drought in the region.

On September 6, 1995, local officials reported what they believed was volcanic activity at Lake Maughan. The alleged activity caused landslides and flooding along Ga-o River that drains Lake Maughan and joins Allah River in the north. Due to this phenomenon, the Philippine Institute of Volcanology and Seismology installed monitoring equipment that established that the so-called activity was man-made.

Less than a year after the 1995 activity, a temporary dam was formed at about 250 m (820 ft) from the outlet of Lake Maughan, alarming the residents within the area due to fear of flash floods. The deposited debris dammed the flowing Ga-o River and caused the lake level to rise by about 6 m (20 ft).

== See also ==
- List of volcanoes in the Philippines
  - List of active volcanoes in the Philippines
  - List of potentially active volcanoes in the Philippines
  - List of inactive volcanoes in the Philippines
