= Mount Hibok-Hibok =

Stratovolcano on Camiguin island in the Philippines

Hibok‑Hibok
- Catarman Volcano
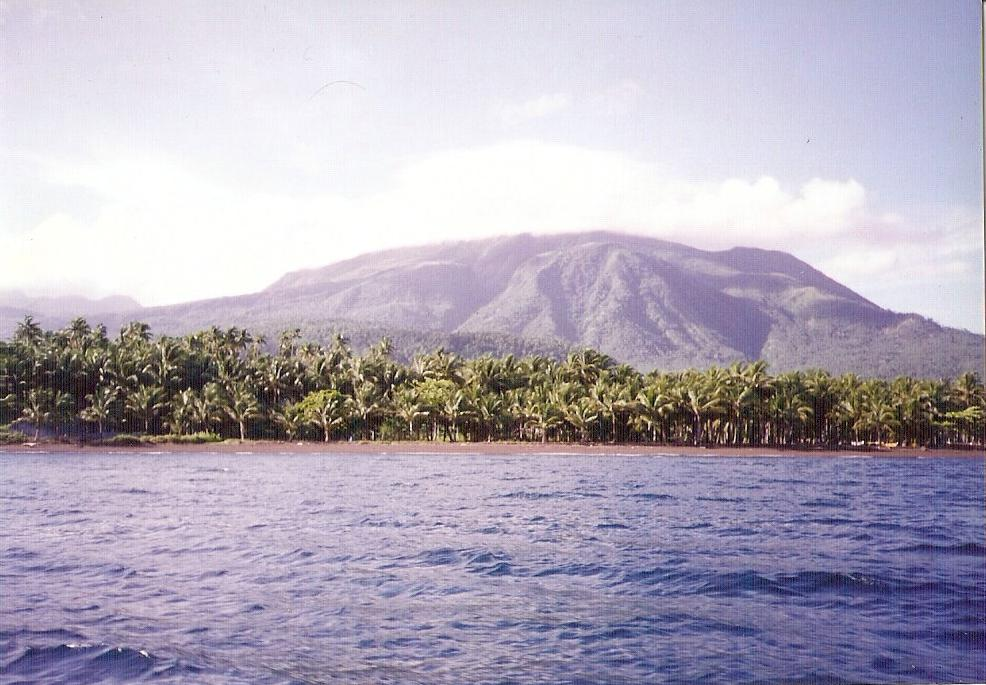

Highest point
- Elevation: 1,332 m (4,370 ft)
- Prominence: 700 m (2,300 ft)
- Coordinates: 9°12′02″N 124°40′05″E

Geography
- Location within Mindanao mainland Location within Philippines
- Country: Philippines
- Region: Northern Mindanao
- Province: Camiguin

Geology
- Mountain type: Stratovolcano
- Volcanic arc: Central Mindanao Volcanic Arc
- Last eruption: 1948–1953

Climbing
- Easiest route: from Ardent Hot Springs

Mount Hibok-Hibok (also known as Catarman Volcano) is a stratovolcano on Camiguin Island in the Philippines. One of the active volcanoes in the country, it is part of the Pacific ring of fire.

== Description ==
Volcanologists classify Hibok-Hibok or Catarman Volcano as a stratovolcano and dome complex with an elevation of 1,332 metres (4,370 ft) and a base diameter of 10 kilometres (6.2 mi). It was described in a 1905 report as having "suddenly risen from the plain a short distance from the town of Catarman in 1872.

Hibok-Hibok (left) and Mt Vulcan (right), the volcanic cone created in the 1871 flank eruption.

It has six hot springs (Ardent Spring, Tangob, Bugong, Tagdo, Naasag and Kiyab), three craters (Kanangkaan Crater, site of a 1948 eruption; Itum Crater, site of an eruption in 1949, and Ilihan Crater, site of a 1950 eruption).

Its adjacent volcanic edifices are: 580 metres (1,900 ft)-high Mount Vulcan, northwest of Hibok-Hibok; 1,552 metres (5,092 ft)-high Mount Mambajao, at the center of Camiguin; 581 metres (1,906 ft)-high Mount Guinsiliban, southernmost Camiguin; 679 metres (2,228 ft)-high Mount Butay; and Mount Uhay, north of Mount Guinsiliban. There are also domes and cones at Campana Hill, Minokol Hill, Tres Marias Hill, Mount Carling, Mount Tibane, and Piyakong Hill.

Mount Timpoong and Hibok-Hibok form the two major landmarks within the Timpoong and Hibok-Hibok Natural Monument. The natural monument became an ASEAN Heritage Park in 2015.

The indigenous Kamigin Manobo are believed to be the original inhabitants of Mount Hibok-Hibok.

== Eruptions ==
Hibok-Hibok has erupted four times in modern history.

The first recorded eruption occurred in 1827 and a similar activity followed in 1862.

Volcanic activity is currently monitored through solar-powered autonomous stations operated by the Hibok-Hibok Volcano Observatory under the Philippine Institute of Volcanology and Seismology.

=== 1871 to 1875 ===
On February 16, 1871, earthquakes and subterranean rumblings began to be felt on the island, which increased in severity until April 30 when a volcanic fissure opened up 400 yards southwest of the village of Catarman, on the northwest flank of Hibok-hibok Volcano. From the opening, lava was continuously ejected and poured into the sea for four years, destroying the town. At the same time, the vent built a cone now known as Mt. Vulcan. In 1875, the Challenger expedition visited the area, and described the mountain as a dome, about 1,950 feet (590 m) in height, without any crater, but still smoking and incandescent at the top.

The portion of the town containing a cemetery has subsided into the sea and is now marked with a huge white cross off the coast. The settlement was relocated to where the present Catarman town center is now located. The remains of old Catarman, including the ruins of the ancient Spanish church, convent and a bell tower, are now called Gui-ob.

=== 1897 to 1902 ===
In 1897, Mt. Hibok-Hibok emitted white sulfurous steam that damaged villages on the island. Solfataric activity continued up to 1902. In 1901, the volcano disappeared.

=== 1948 to 1951 ===
From 1948 to 1951, Mt. Hibok-Hibok constantly rumbled and smoked. There were also landslides and earthquakes followed by dome building and nuee ardente. The Peléan eruption in 1948 from the Kanangkaan crater caused little damage and loss of life. The eruption of 1949, originating from Itum crater caused 79 deaths due to landslides. On the morning of December 4, 1951, the volcano erupted again. This time, however, it unleashed boiling lava, poisonous gases, and landslides enough to destroy nearly 19 square kilometres (7.3 sq mi) of land particularly in Mambajao. All in all, over 3,000 people were killed. Before the eruption of Mt. Hibok-Hibok in 1951, the population of Camiguin had reached 69,000. After the eruption, the population was reduced to about 34,000 due to massive emigration.

Volcanologists observed an eruption pattern during the 1948–1952 eruptions (a cycle of four phases) beginning with a short period of emission of steam from the crater and avalanches of volcanic materials, followed by explosions or steam blast with emission of heavy clouds of steam, ash and other fragmentary volcanic materials with a strong possibility of the development of pyroclastic flows. The third phase involves eruption of incandescent materials, emission of ash and steam in large amounts, formation of flows and occasional minor crater outbursts, and finally a decrease in steam and other ejecta from the crater.

== Monitoring ==
=== Alert levels ===
Hibok-hibok Volcano Alert Levels
Alert Level	Criteria	Interpretation
0	Background, quiet.	No eruption in foreseeable future.
1	Low level seismic, fumarolic, other unrest.	Magmatic, tectonic or hydrothermal disturbance; no eruption imminent.
2	Low to moderate level of seismic, other unrest with positive evidence for involvement of magma.	Probable magmatic intrusion; could eventually lead to an eruption.
3	Relatively high and increasing unrest, including numerous b-type earthquakes, accelerating ground deformation and rockfalls, increased vigor of fumaroles, gas emission.	Increasing likelihood of an eruption, possibly within days to week.
4	Intense unrest, including harmonic tremor and/or may “long period” (=low frequency) earthquakes or quiet lava emissions and/or dome growth and/or small explosions.	Magma close to or at earth’s surface. Hazardous explosive eruption likely, possible within hours to days.
5	Hazardous explosive eruption in progress, with pyroclastic flows, surges and/or eruption column rising at least 6 km or 20,000 feet above sea level.	Explosive eruption in progress. Hazards in valleys and downwind.

== Hiking activity ==
Mt. Hibok-Hibok is a popular hiking destination in Camiguin island. A permit from the DENR office in Mambajao is required. It normally takes 3–5 hours to reach the summit; the usual jump-off is Ardent Hot Springs in Mambajao. Views from the summit include the nearby White Island, Bohol to the north, Eastern Mindanao to the east and the island of Siquijor to the west. The mossy crater of Camiguin's past eruption can also be seen.

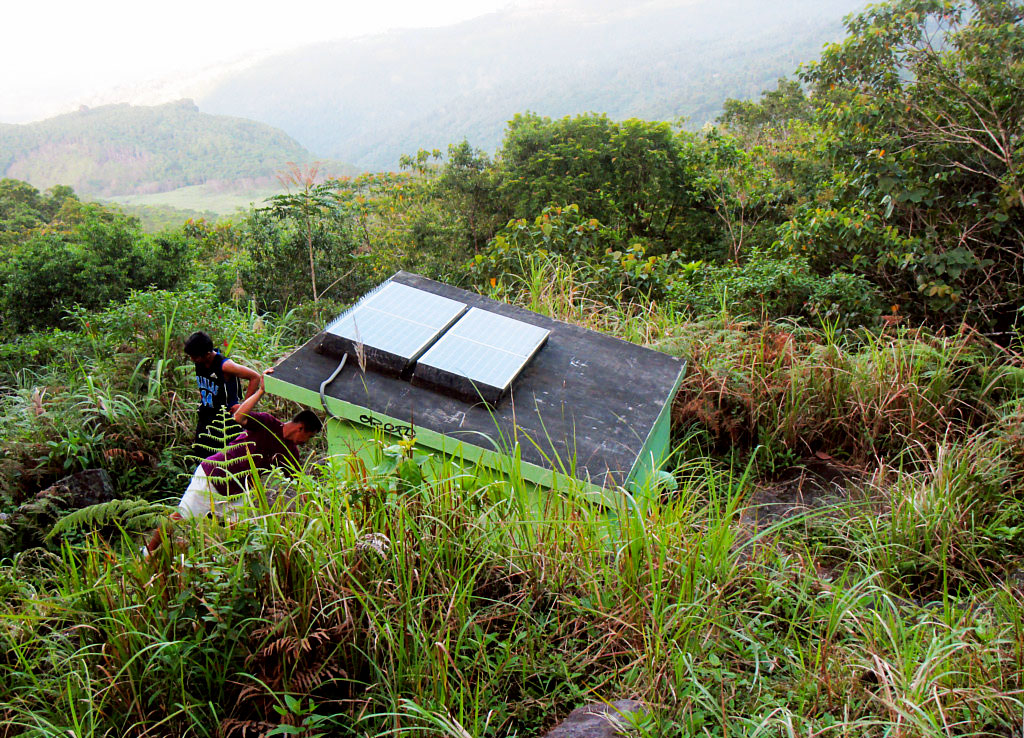
A solar-powered remote monitoring station located at Hibok-Hibok volcano

Mt. Vulcan can be hiked by way of the Stations of the Cross or The Walkway in Bonbon, Catarman. On the trail are the statues depicting the Roman Catholic Stations of the Cross, which are 14 events in the crucifixion of Jesus, at intervals on the climb. They are a memorial to the dead from the last eruption in the 1950s. Mt. Vulcan, which is locally called the Old Volcano, is a misnomer as it is actually the youngest volcano on the island, formed in the 1871 eruption.

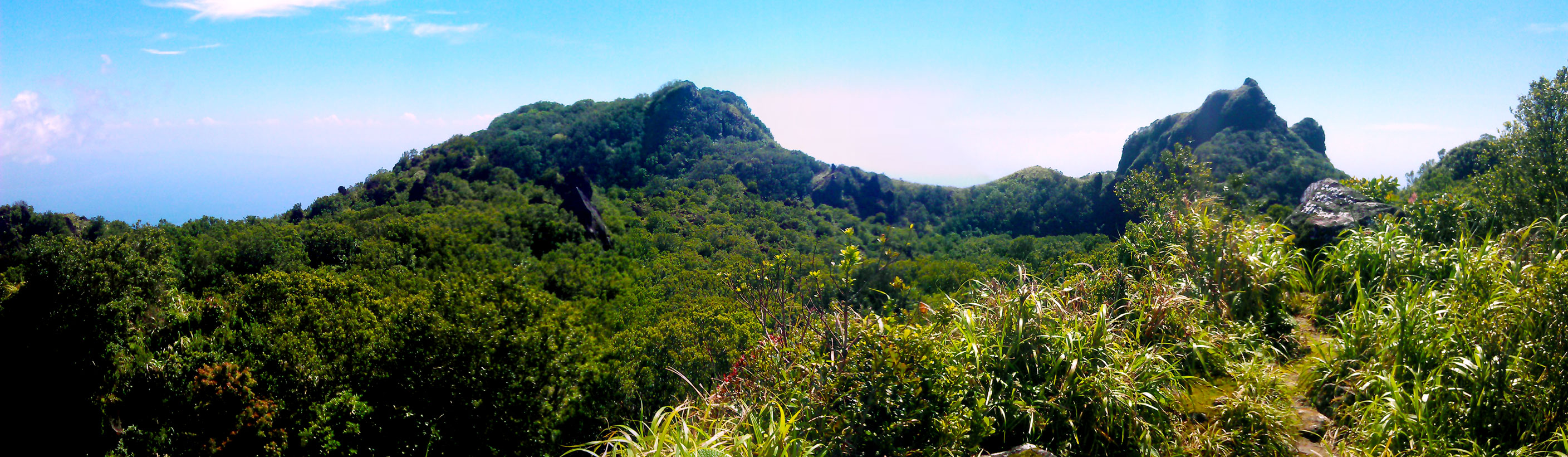
Hibok-Hibok Volcano summit panorama

== See also ==
- List of volcanoes in the Philippines
  - List of active volcanoes in the Philippines
  - List of potentially active volcanoes in the Philippines
  - List of inactive volcanoes in the Philippines
- Philippine Institute of Volcanology and Seismology
