= Mount Binuluan =

Remote volcano on the island of Luzon in the Philippines

- Mount Ambalatungan; Mount Binubulauan
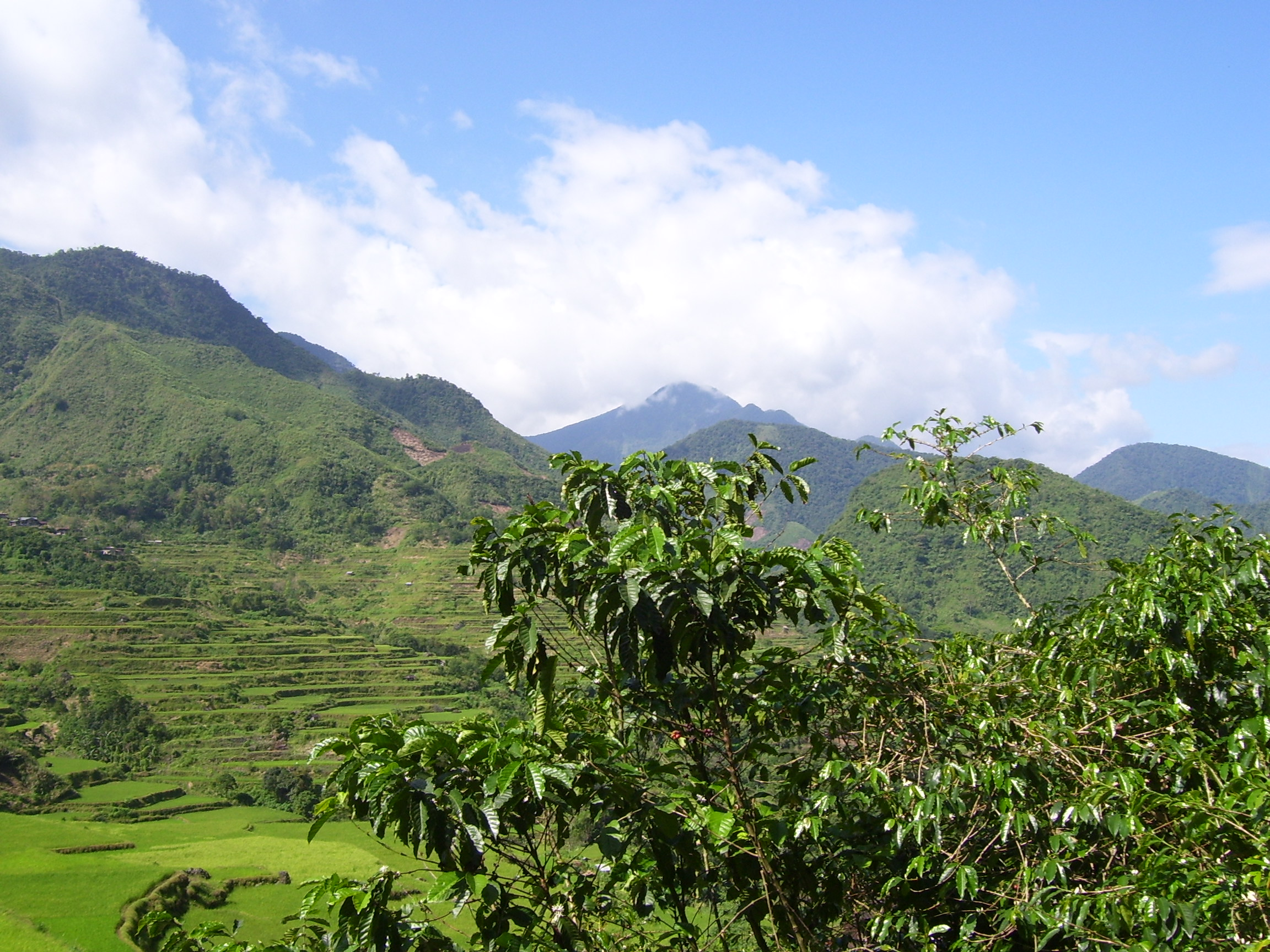
- Mount Binuluan as viewed from the village of Bangtitan in Upper Uma, Lubuagan

Highest point
- Elevation: 2,329 m (7,641 ft)
- Prominence: 431 m (1,414 ft)
- Listing: Active volcanoes in the Philippines
- Coordinates: 17°18′22.4″N 121°5′38.6″E

Geography
- Location within Luzon Location within Philippines
- Country: Philippines
- Region: Cordillera Administrative Region
- Province: Kalinga
- City/municipality: Lubuagan; Pasil; Tinglayan
- Parent range: Cordillera Central
- Topo map: 7277-IV

Geology
- Mountain type: Stratovolcano
- Volcanic arc: Luzon Volcanic Arc
- Last eruption: 1952 (?), 1986 (?)

Climbing
- First ascent: Unknown
- Easiest route: Unknown

Mount Binuluan (also known as Ambalatungan) is a remote volcano in the Kalinga province of the Cordillera Administrative Region of the Philippines. The 2,329-metre-high (7,641 ft) mountain is part of the Cordillera Central mountain range on Luzon island, the largest island in the country. Binuluan exhibits active volcanism through numerous fumarole fields, solfataras and hot springs on its slope. There were reports of possible eruptions in 1952 and 1986 (or 1987), but they are unverified.

== Geography ==
Mount Binuluan is one of the highest peaks in the area. The mountain is surrounded by the municipalities of Lubuagan, Pasil and Tinglayan in Kalinga province.

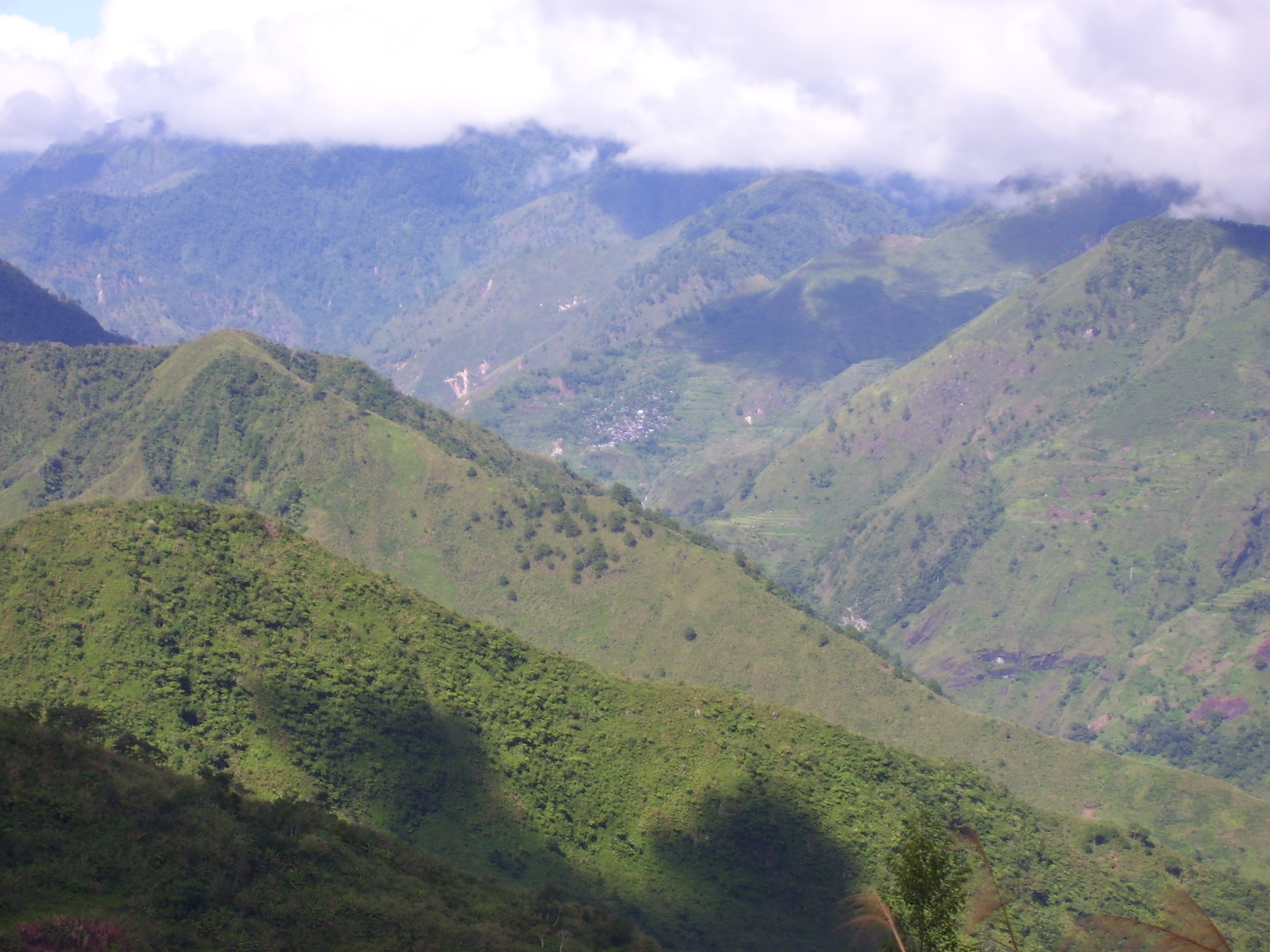
Pasil River Valley northwest of Mount Binuluan with the slopes of Binuluan in the foreground

Southeast of the mountain is the Chico River flowing from southwest to northeast direction, while due northwest of the mountain is Pasil River, also flowing from southwest to northeast direction merging with Chico River just past the mountain. Mount Binuluan belongs to a range of mountains situated between the two rivers, trending southwest to northeast. Just southwest of Binuluan is Mount Mosimus 2,178 m (7,146 ft), followed by Mount Cauitan 2,569 m (8,428 ft) and Mount Alchan (Alchanon) 2,567 m (8,422 ft), the 19th and 20th tallest mountain in the Philippines. South of this line of mountains are Mount Chumangil 1,996 m (6,549 ft) and Mount Patoc 1,819 m (5,968 ft), the other volcano of the Central Cordillera Range displaying strong fumarolic activity.

== Geology ==
The Smithsonian Institution's Global Volcanism Program list Binuluan under the Ambalatungan Group. The Bumabag and Podakan volcanoes could possibly be flank vents of Mount Binuluan.

The Philippines Institute of Volcanology and Seismology (PHIVOLCS) lists Binuluan or Ambalatungan as an inactive volcano.

== Geothermal features ==
Mount Binuluan exhibits a number of active geothermal features. There are a number of sites with strong steam emission, fumarolic activity, surface sulfur deposits, hot fresh water springs, hot sulfurous water springs, sulfur staining of riverine rocks, poisonous gas emissions, recent volcanic gas related deaths (>100 in last 20 years at Batong Buhay mines alone), heat destruction of vegetation, poisonous water, fumarole fields with new and shifting activity.

=== Bu-ot Fumarole Field ===
The Bu-ot Fumarole Field (Balatoc dialect) is located on Balatoc tribal land, along the Pasil River on the steep western valley slope, with the path going up to Balatoc village immediately to the right of the fumarole field.

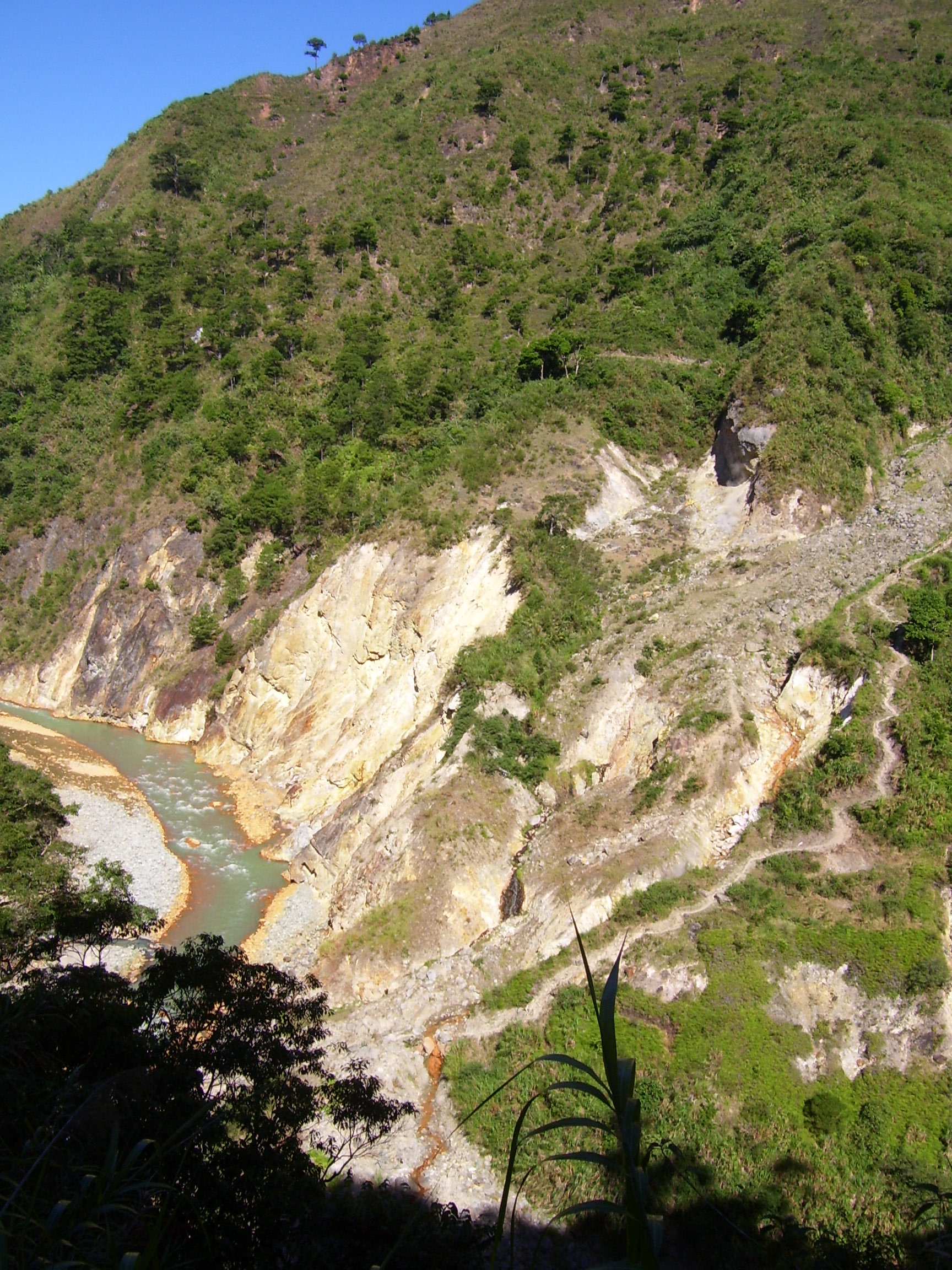
Bu-ot Fumarole Field

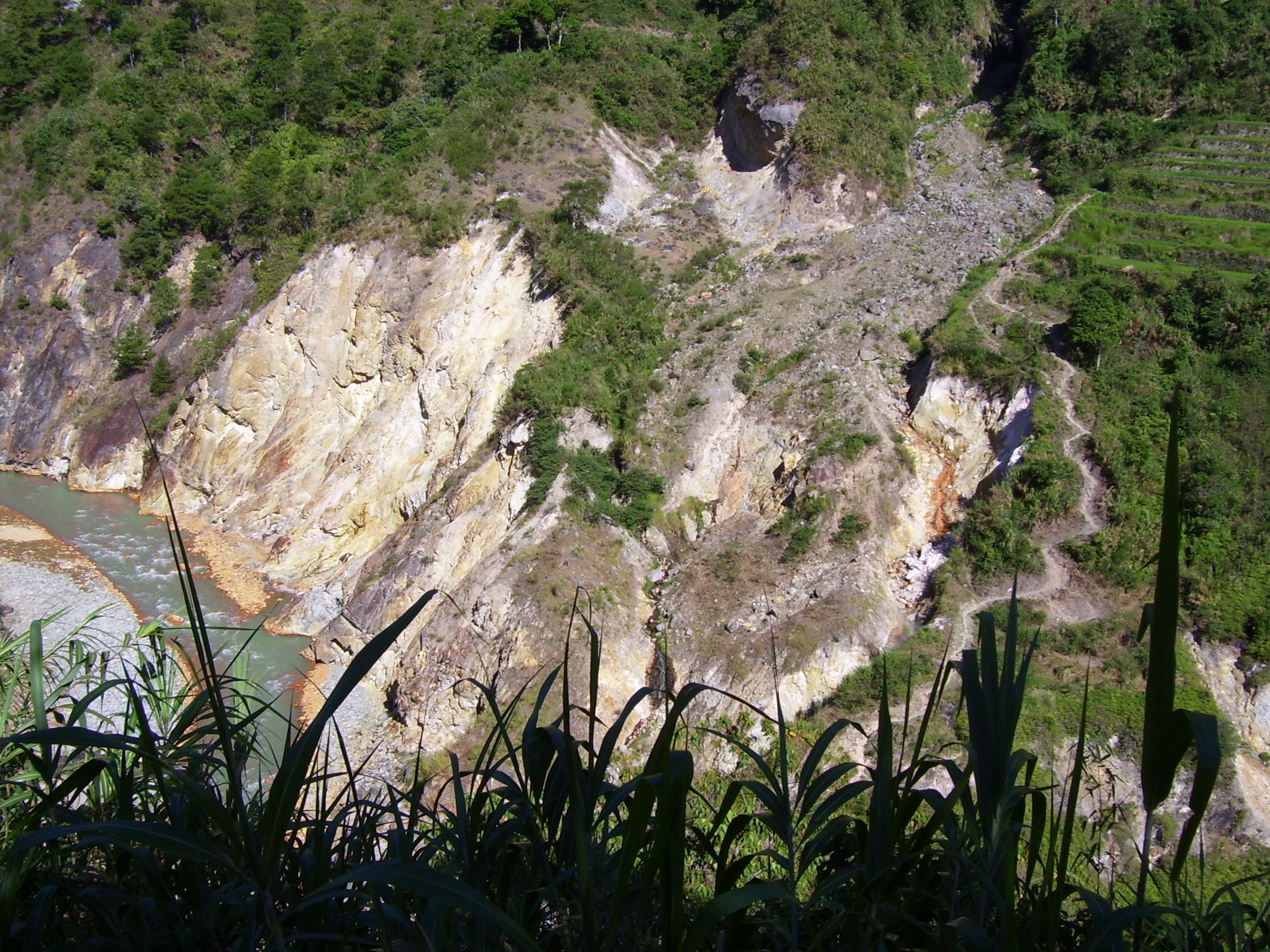
Steep-sided Bu-ot Fumarole Field

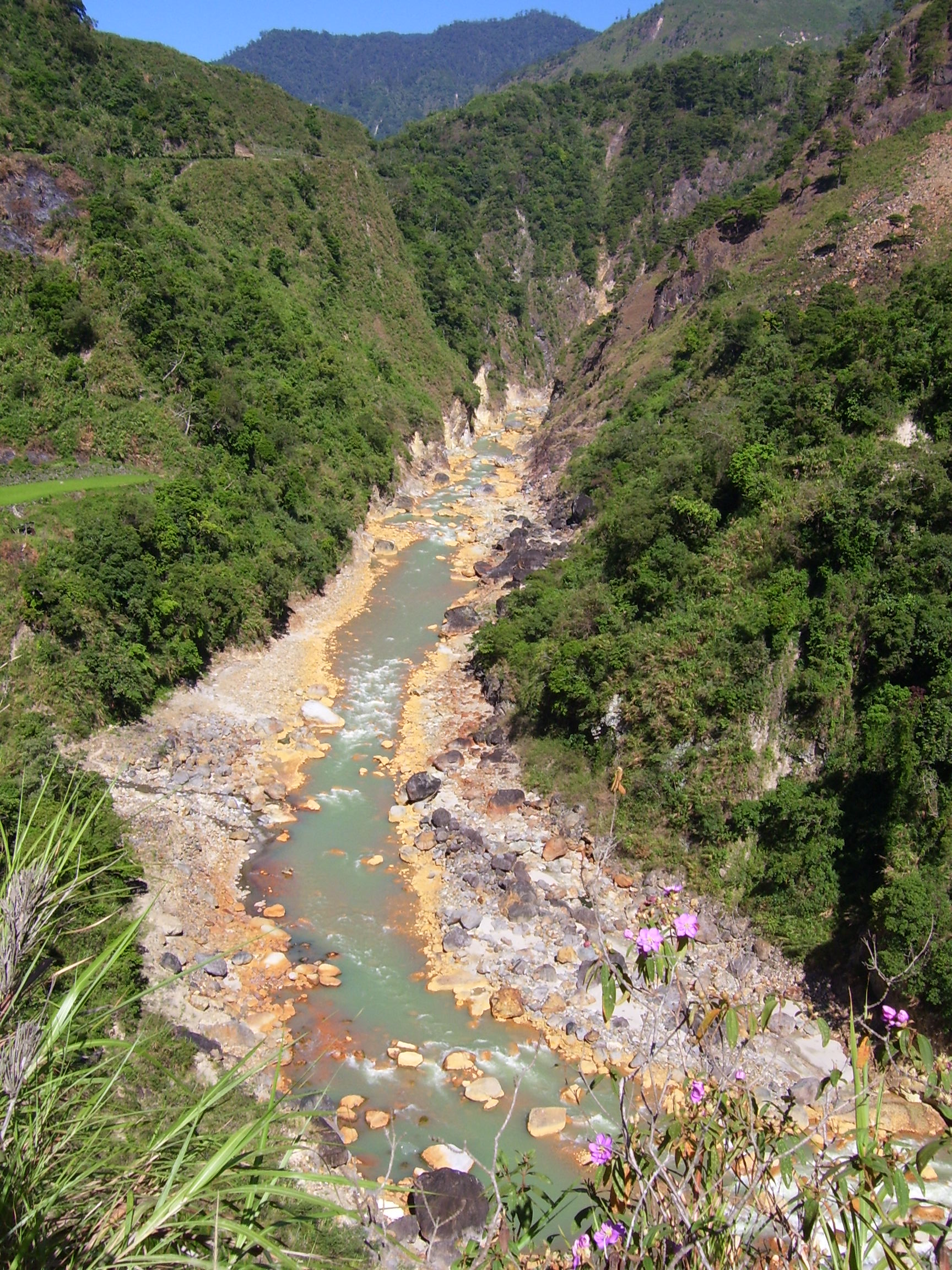
Heavily sulfur-stained Pasil River, upstream from Bu-ot Fumarole Field

=== Bum-bag Fumarole Fields ===
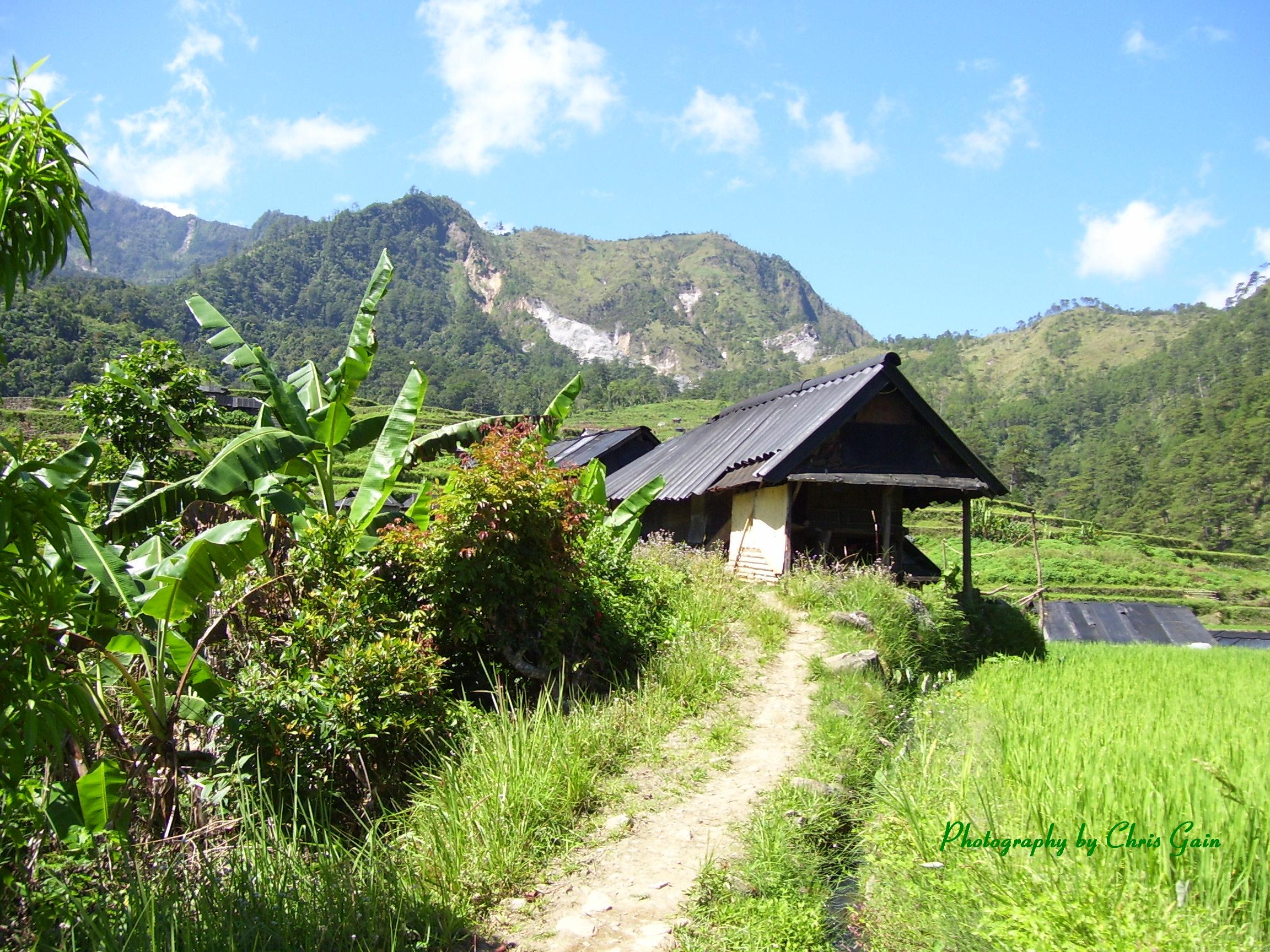
Bum-bag Fumarole Fields from a distance

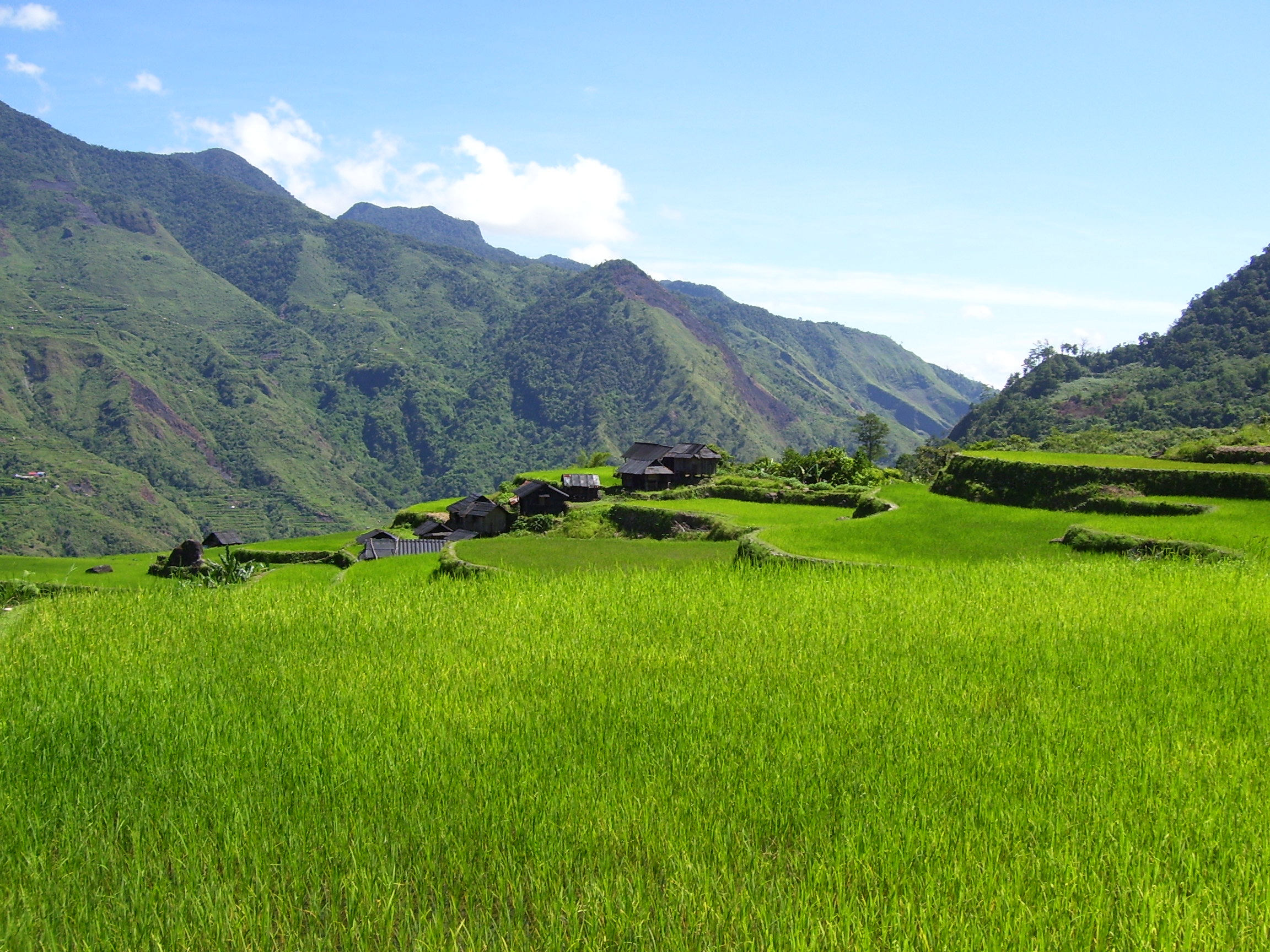
Bum-bag Rice Terraces

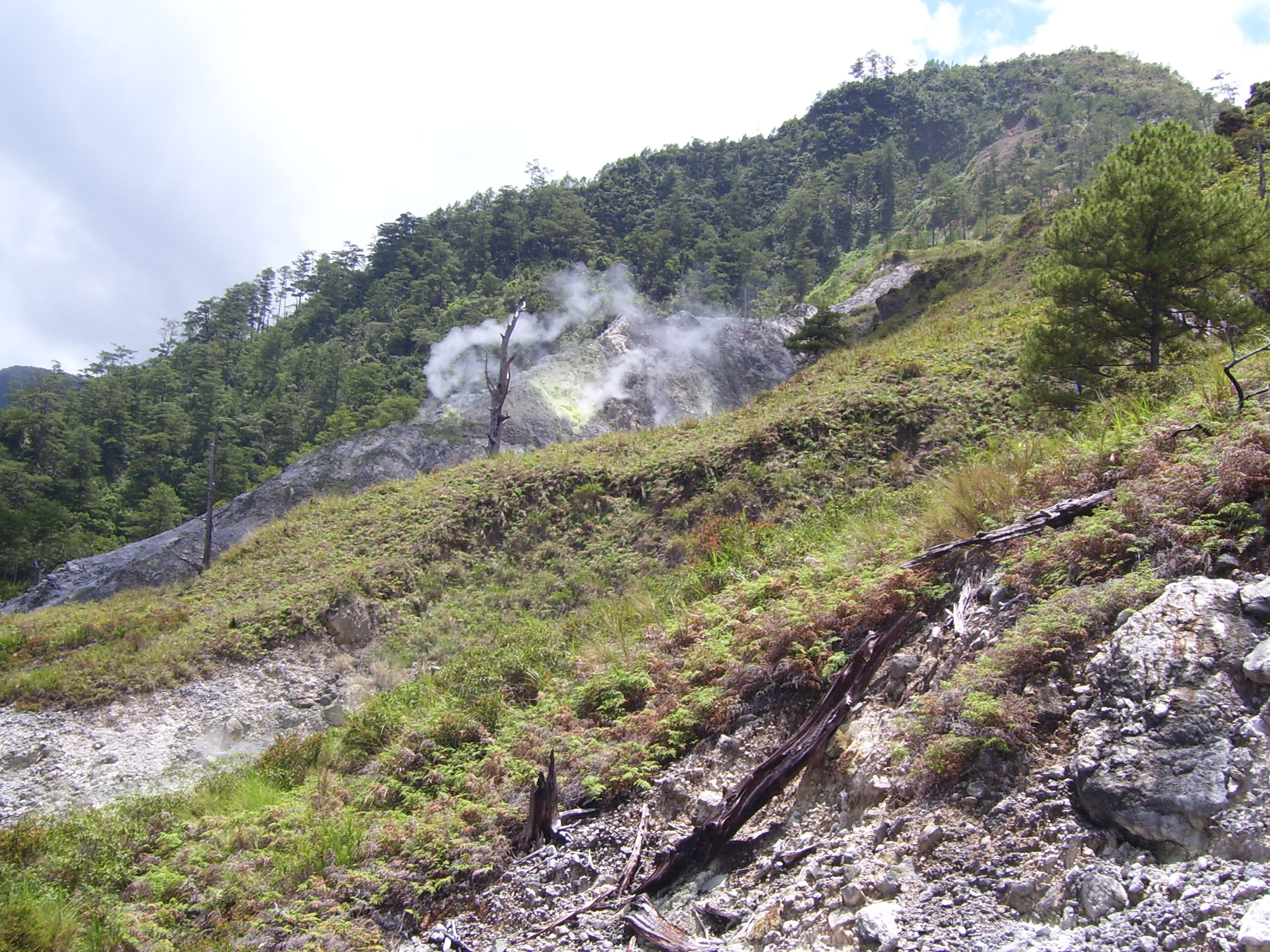
Bum-bag Fumarole Field #1

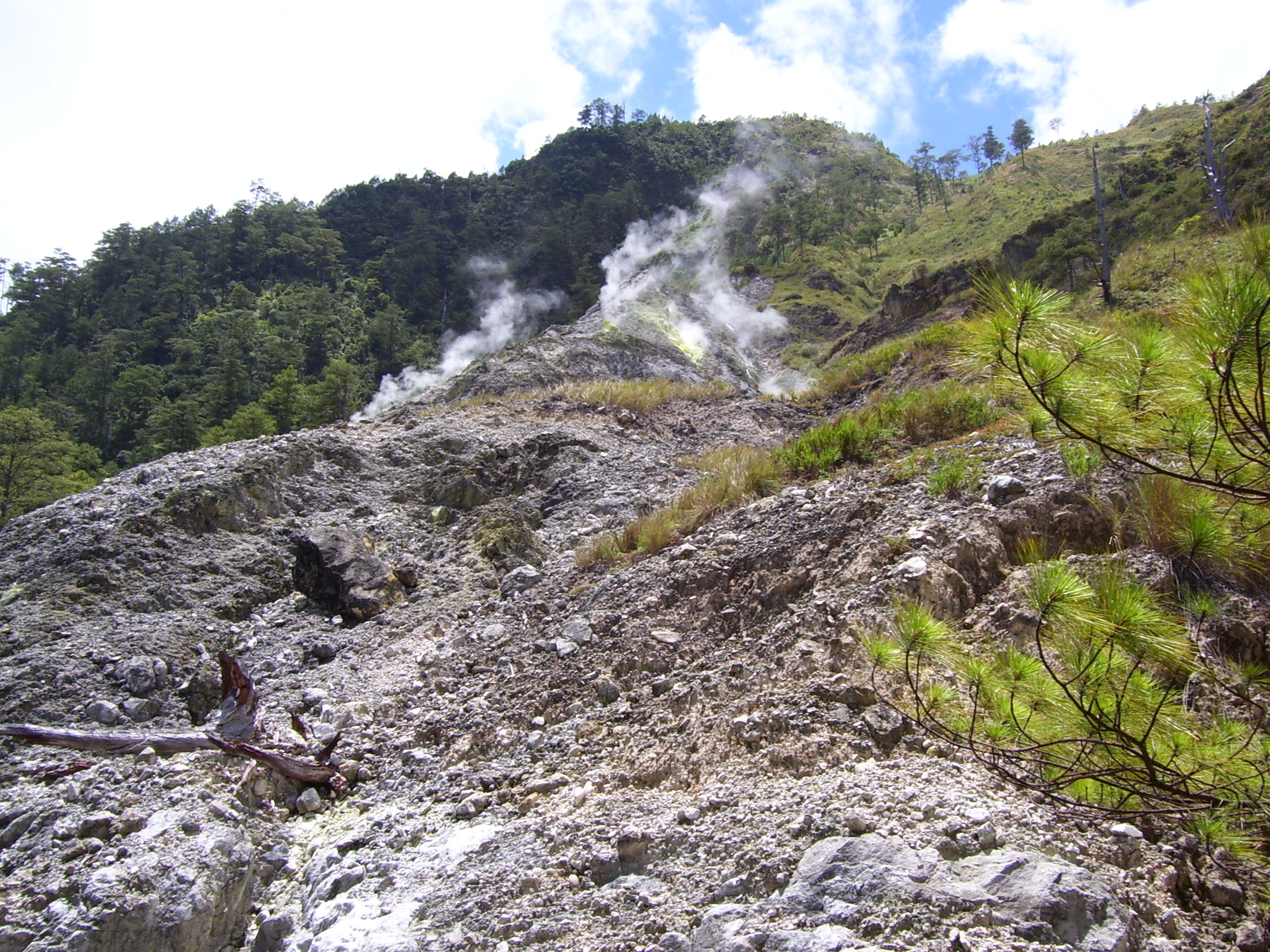
A closer look of Bum-bag Fumarole Field #1
- Field 1, located about 100 metres (330 ft) north of Field 2 has about 11 separate fumarole vents, and covers about 2 hectares (4.9 acres), and was the most active of Fields 1, 2 and 3 as of 2008.
- Field 2, (approximate location 17°19.59′N 121°5.016′E) has 16 separate fumarole vents, and covers about 2 hectares (4.9 acres) in 2008.
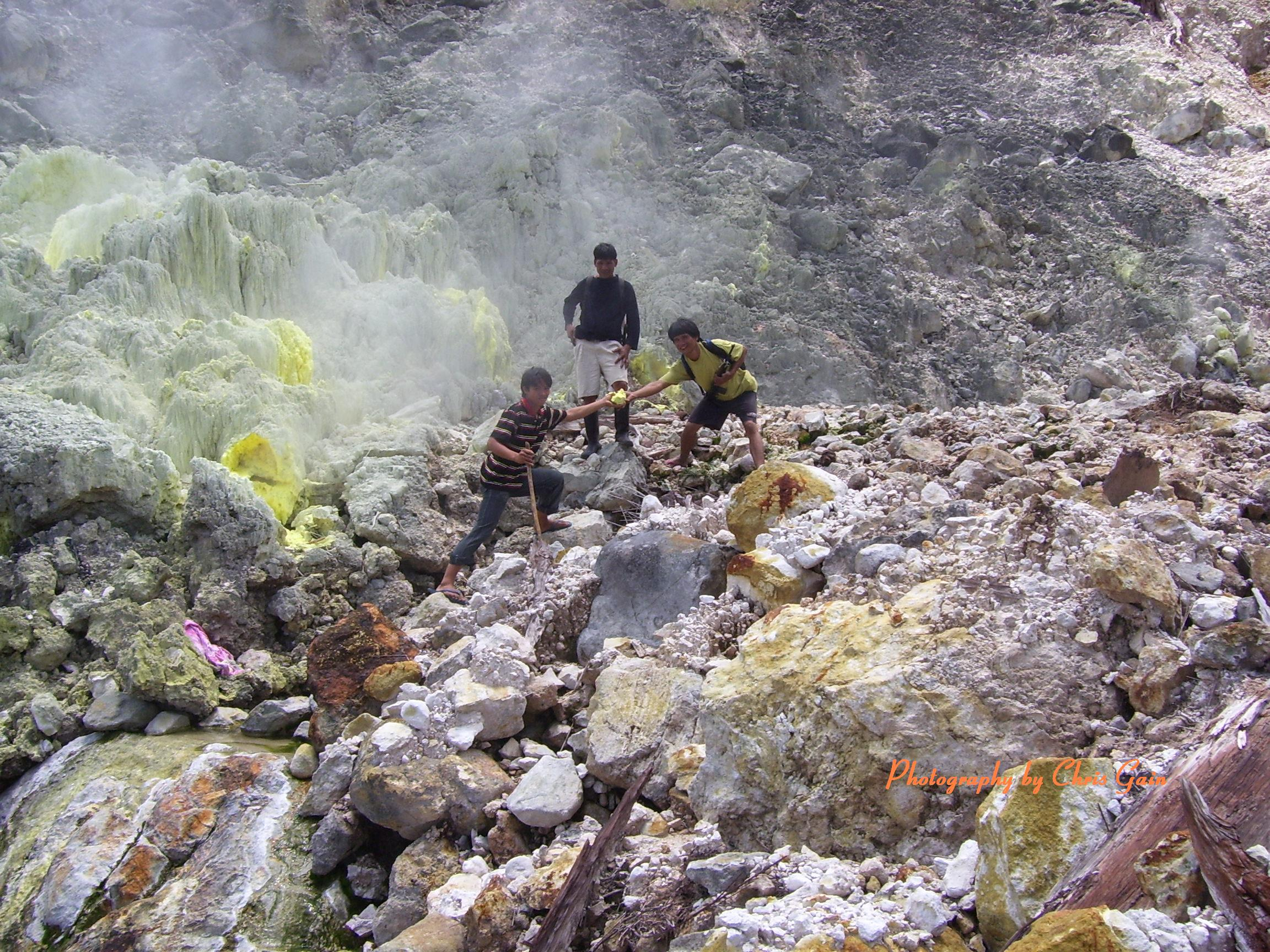
Bum-bag Fumarole Field #2

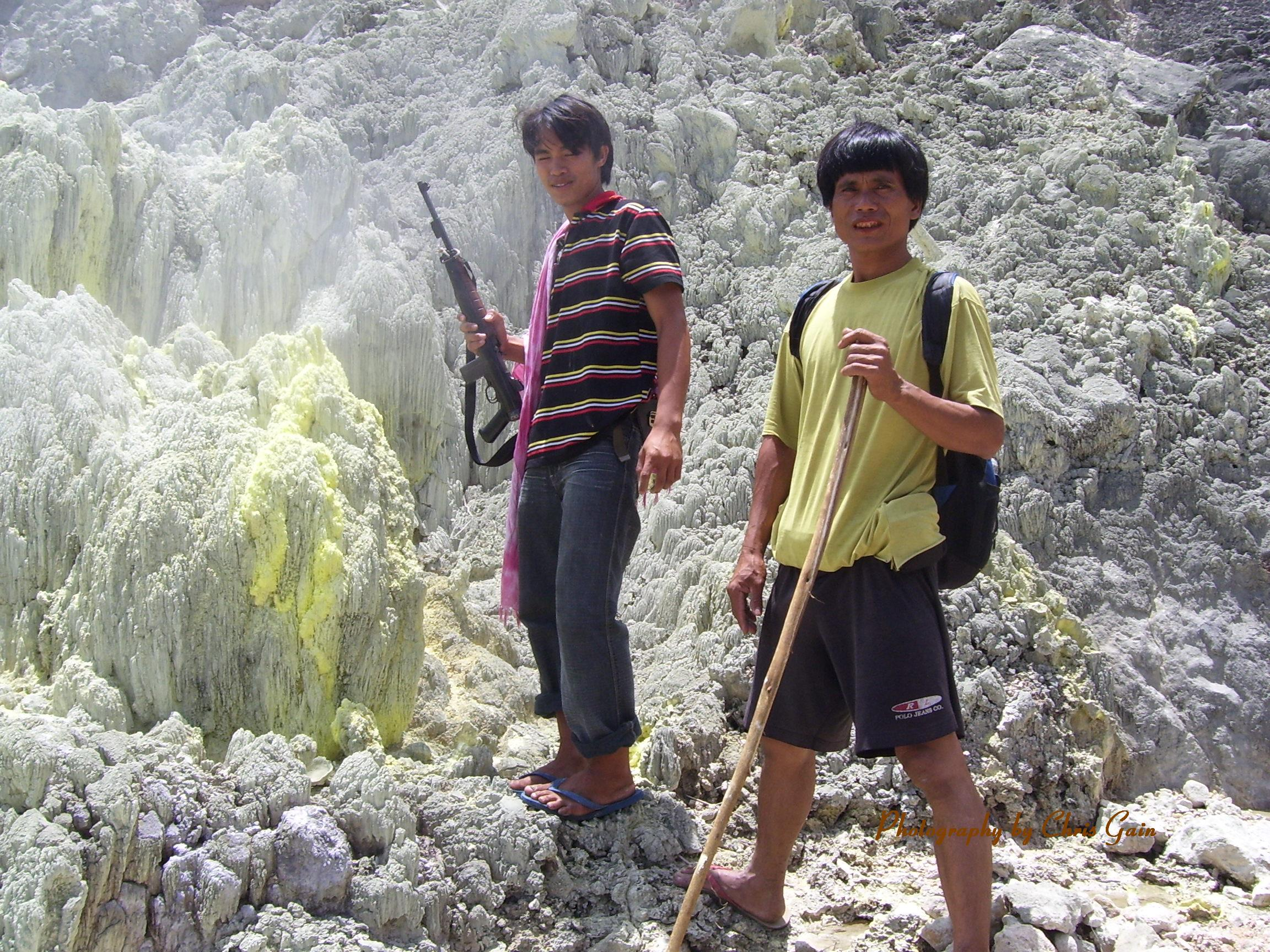
Armed private guards at Bum-bag Fumarole Field #2

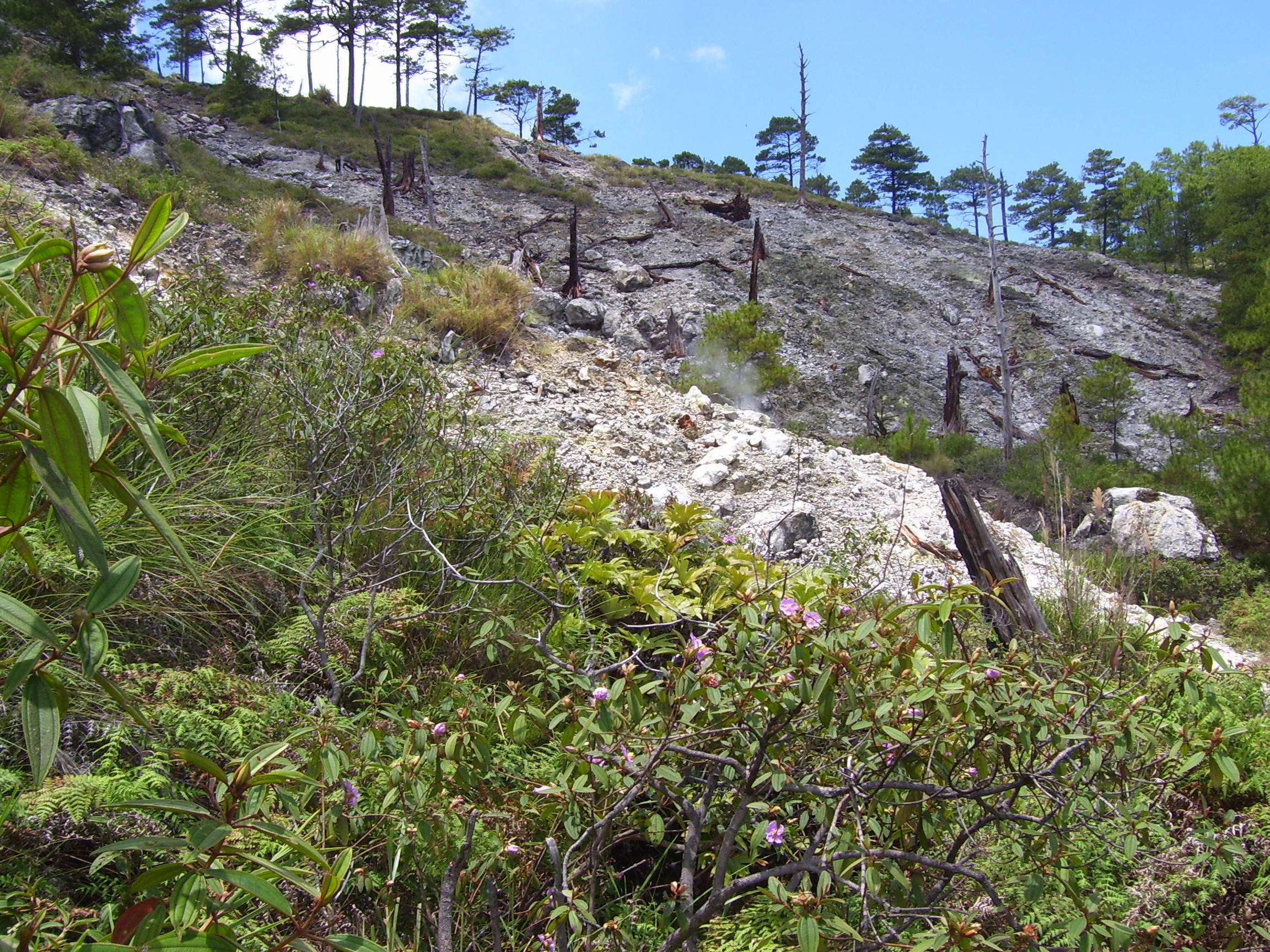
Bum-bag Fumarole Field #3
- Field 3 is located about 250 metres (820 ft) south of field 2.
- Field 4, located about 1 kilometre (0.62 mi) SE of Field 2 is believed to have the largest surface deposit of sulfur among the fields and is the most active. Field May 4 be consistent with the GVP's 'Podakan Volcano'.

=== Sugo-oc fumarole field ===
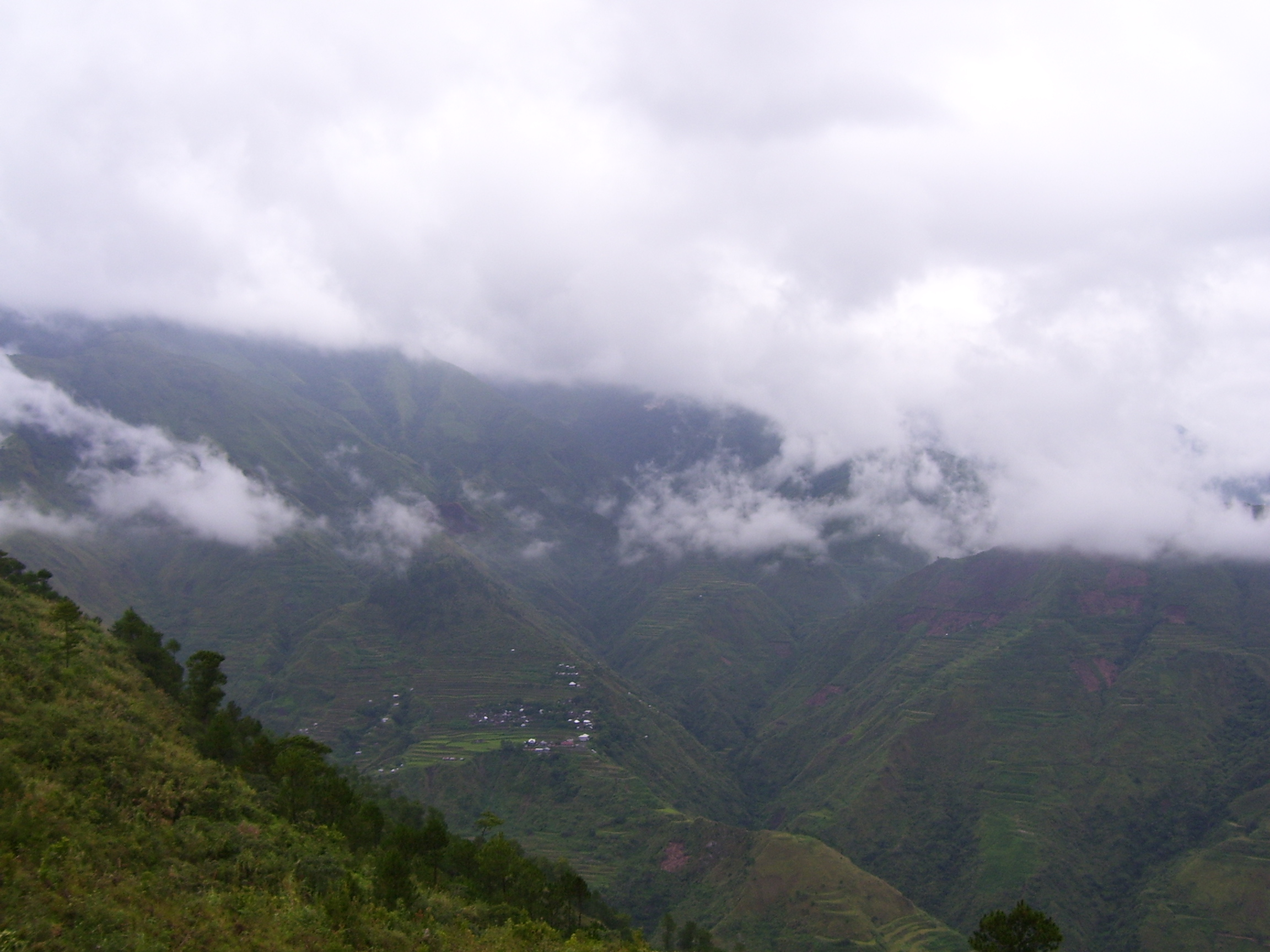
Sugo-oc Fumarole Field

== Hot Springs ==
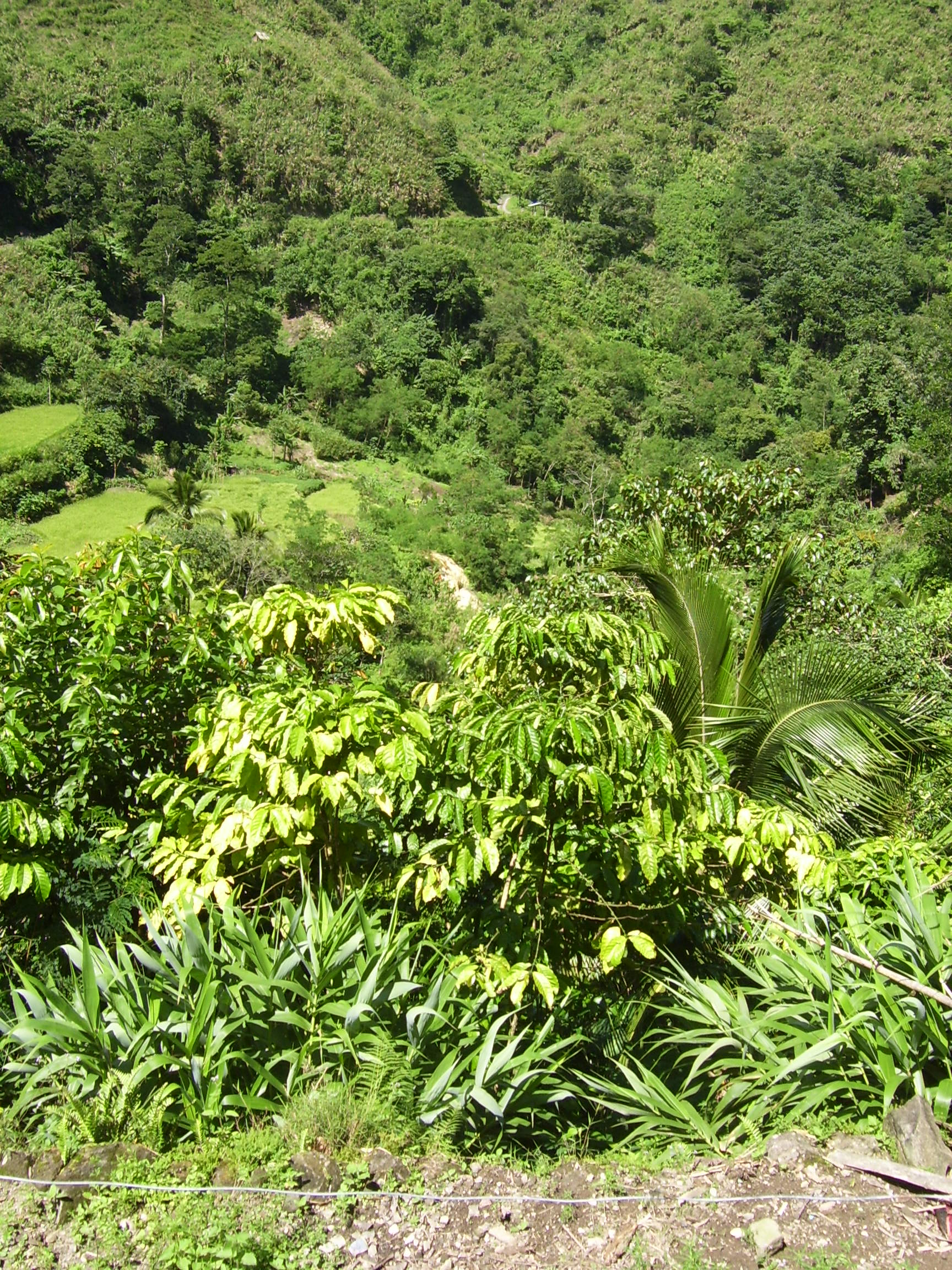
Sun-ut Sulfur Spring (centre)

=== Sun-ut hot spring ===
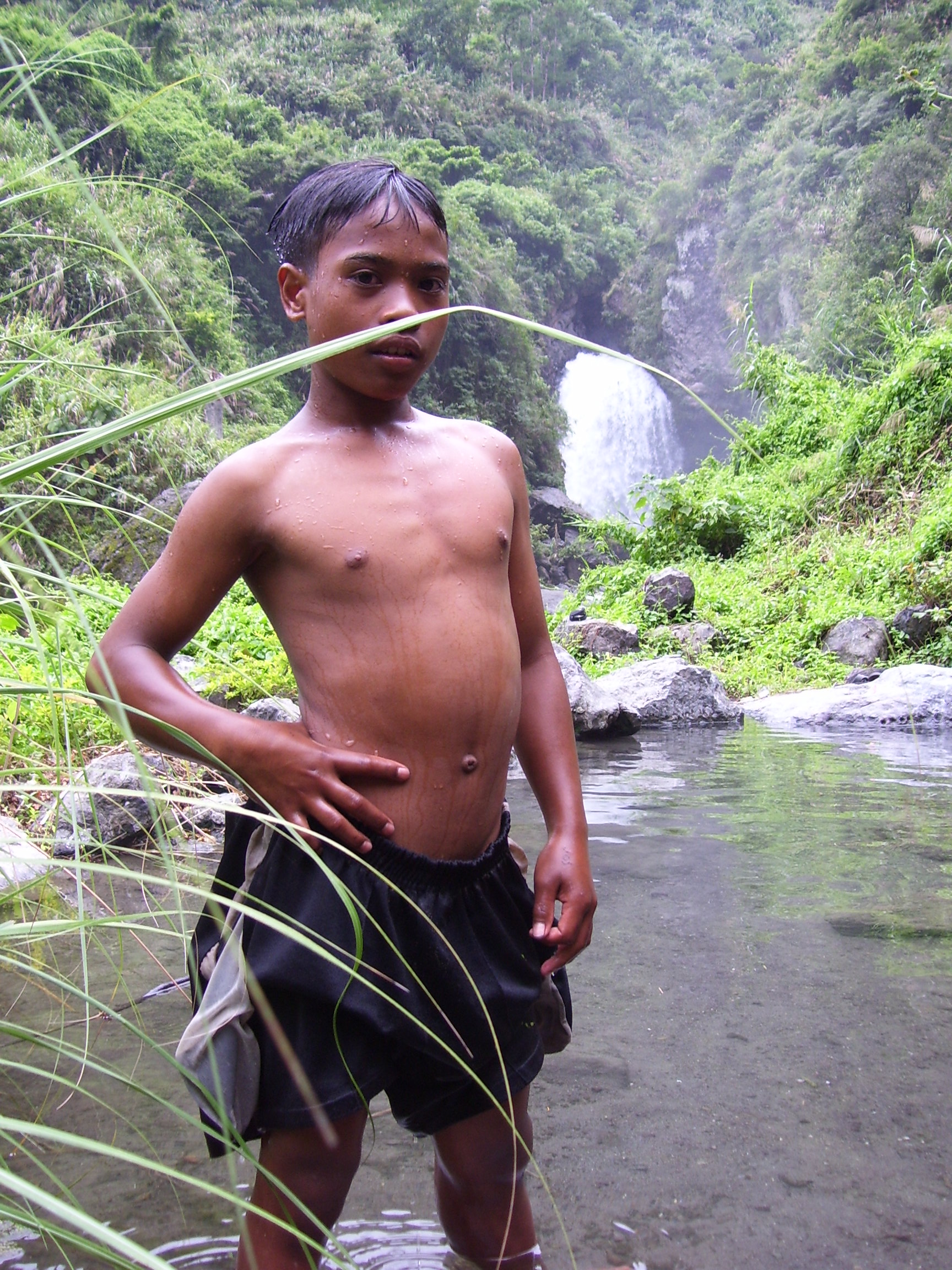
Bunog Falls and Hot Springs

== Possible eruptions ==
A possible phreatic or steam eruption was reported from Mount Binuluan in 1952, during which a sulfur-rich debris flow killed a dozen people. Details about the eruption in 1952 are still scant. In 2007 and 2008, some 90- and 100-year-old elders in Barangay Tulgao in Tinglayan said the loss of life in 1952 was caused by an eruption during a typhoon followed with the collapse of a natural earth bank below Sugo-oc fumarole field, high on the northern side of the Bunog River. The consequent mudslide buried a few houses below near the villages of Dananao and Sumadel, Tinglayan, killing maybe 12 people or thereabouts.

In 2007 and 2008, people in southern Kalinga around Binuluan spoke of an 'eruption' at Sugo-oc in 1986 or 1987. During the Abra earthquake at 20:16 hours on January 13, 2008, buildings in Tinglayan shook and windows rattled for about 10 seconds.

There were reports about that earthquake of 1986, which was felt also felt throughout Lubuagan, was simultaneous with an eruption at Sugo-oc resulting in the ejection of ash and rock. Three people in Dananao village were killed by the ejected rocks. Because of these, there was a large migration out of the village with the Dananao people taking possession of a land along the Tubuk-to-Aurora Road in eastern Kalinga and resettling there.

== See also ==
- List of volcanoes in the Philippines
  - List of active volcanoes in the Philippines
  - List of potentially active volcanoes in the Philippines
  - List of inactive volcanoes in the Philippines
