= Cordillera Central (Luzon) =

Mountain range in Luzon, Philippines

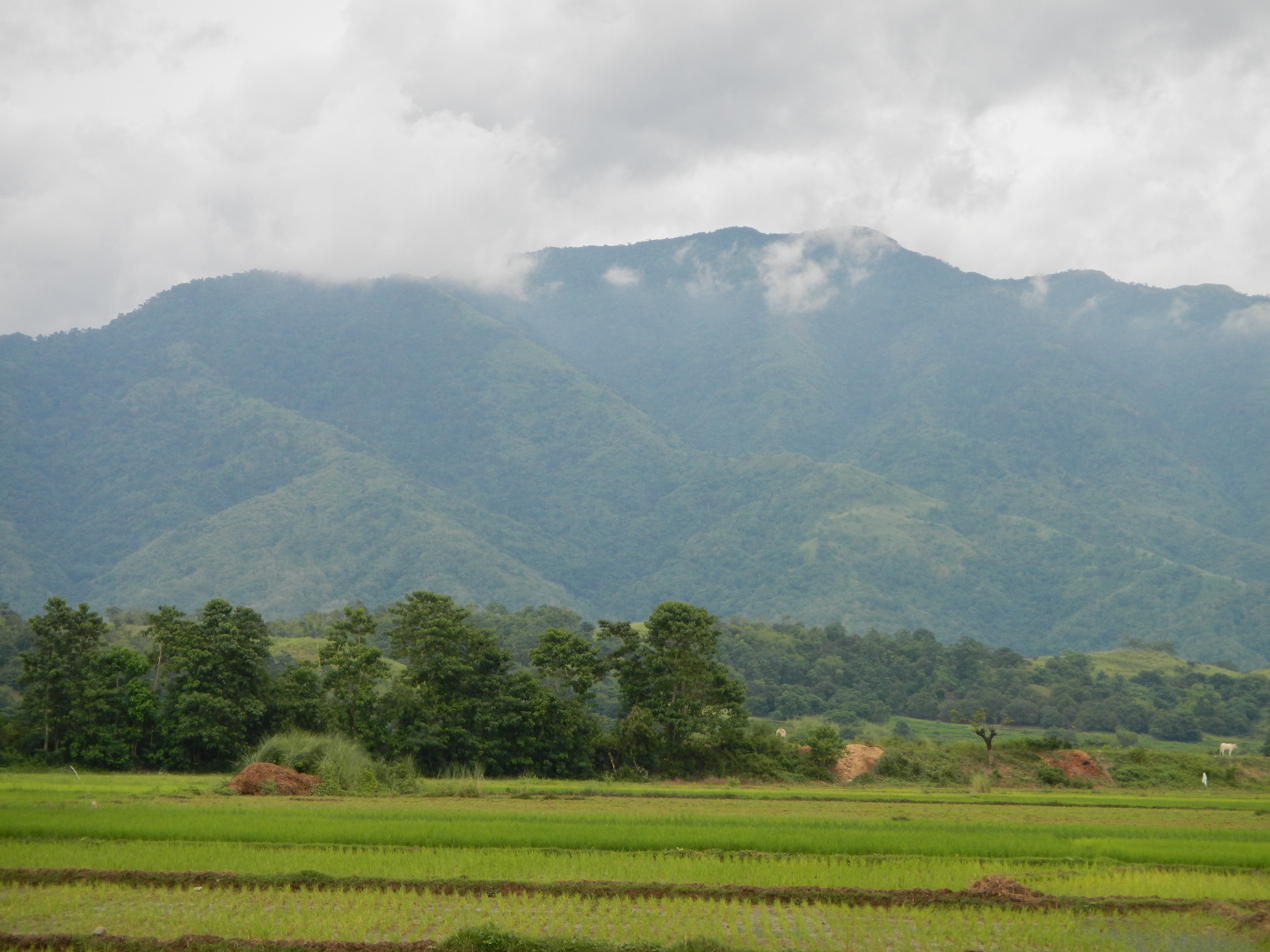
- The southern limits of the range as viewed from the plains of Natividad, Pangasinan

Highest point
- Peak: Mount Pulag
- Elevation: 2,928 m (9,606 ft)

Dimensions
- Length: 320 km (200 mi) north-south
- Width: 118 km (73 mi) east-west
- Area: 22,500 km^{2} (8,700 mi^{2})

Geography
- Location within Philippines Location within Luzon
- Country: Philippines
- Provinces: Abra; Apayao; Benguet; Cagayan; Ifugao; Ilocos Norte; Ilocos Sur; Kalinga; La Union; Mountain Province; Nueva Vizcaya; Pangasinan
- Range coordinates: 17°20′N 120°57′E

The Cordillera Central or Cordillera Range is a massive mountain range 320 kilometres (200 mi) long north–south and 118 kilometres (73 mi) east-west situated in the north-central part of the island of Luzon, in the Philippines. The mountain range encompasses all provinces of the Cordillera Administrative Region (Abra, Apayao, Benguet, Ifugao, Kalinga and Mountain Province), as well as portions of eastern Ilocos Norte, eastern Ilocos Sur, eastern La Union, northeastern Pangasinan, western Nueva Vizcaya, and western Cagayan.

To the north, the mountain range terminates at the northern shores of Luzon along the Babuyan Channel in Ilocos Norte and Cagayan provinces. At its southeastern part, the Central Cordillera is linked to the Sierra Madre Mountains, the longest mountain range in the country, through the Caraballo Mountains in Nueva Vizcaya province. During Spanish colonial period, the whole range was called Nueva Provincia (New Province).

== Geography ==
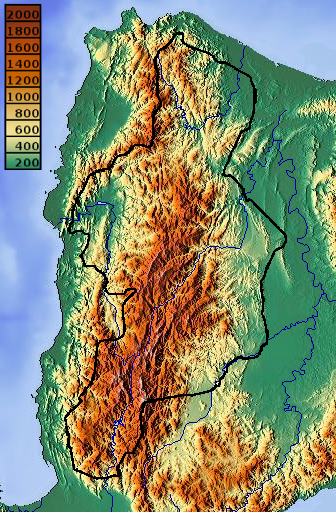
Cordillera Administrative Region (outlined) covers most of the range.

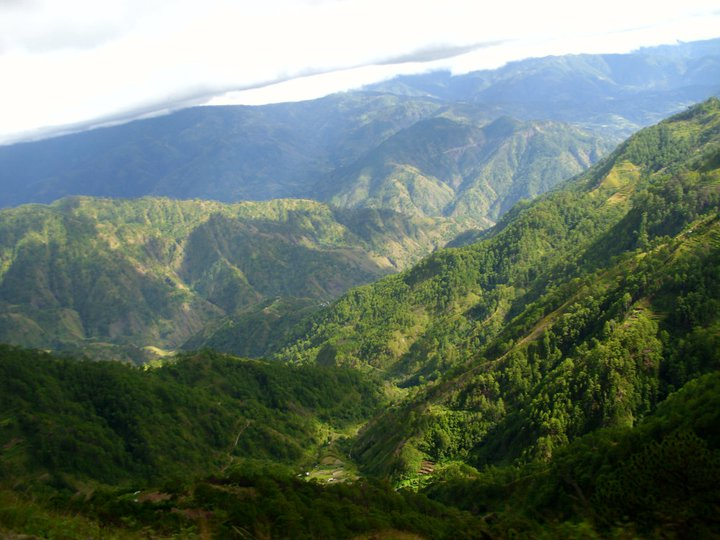
A portion of the range in Benguet surrounding Baguio

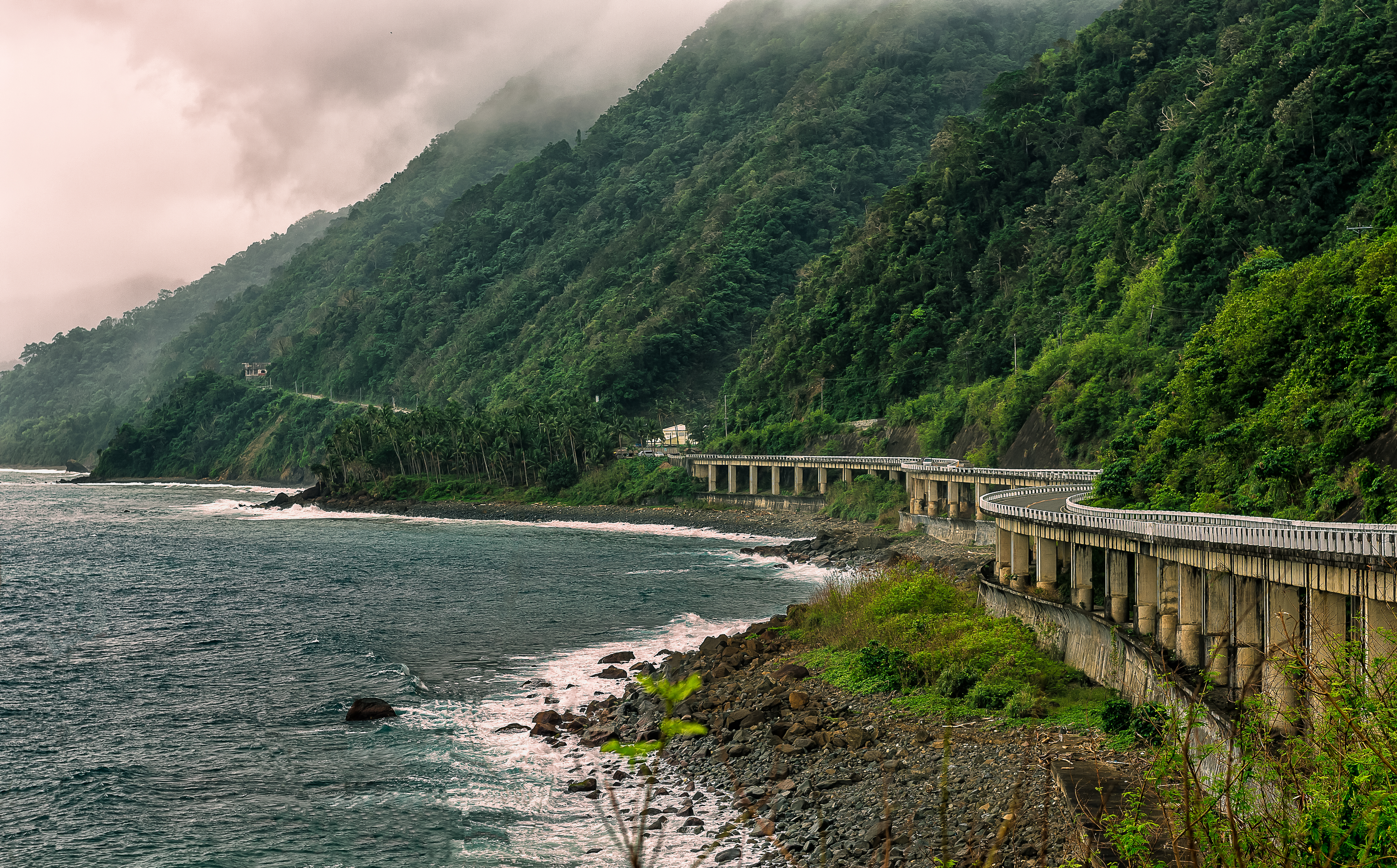
Patapat Viaduct in Ilocos Norte, forced over the sea by the northern extremity of the mountain range

The Cordillera Central is the highest mountain range in the Philippines. It comprises about 1/6 of the whole Luzon island with a total area of 22,500 km^{2} (8,700 sq mi). The highest mountain in the range, Mount Pulag, is also the highest mountain in Luzon at 2,928 metres (9,606 ft). It is officially the third highest mountain in the country after Mount Dulang-dulang and Mount Apo on Mindanao Island, the second largest island of the Philippines.

The mountain range separates the Ilocos plains on the west and the Cagayan Valley on the east. It also affects the weather pattern in the island of Luzon in such it acts as a barrier against the Northeast and Southwest monsoons as well as cyclones crossing the island.

This is the biggest and highest mountain chain in the Philippines, measuring 320 km (200 mi) long north to south, and 118 km (73 mi) width east to west, and consists of three ranges. The Malayan Range is located in the northern and western portion of the Cordillera, followed by the Central Range, and then the Polis Range in the eastern portion. Mount Data contains the headwaters for Suyoc, which flows into the Abra River, the Chico flows into the Cagayan River, the Asin flows into the Magat River, and the Agno River flows into Lingayen Gulf.

=== Topography ===
List of Peaks in Cordillera by elevation.

- Mount Pulag 9,606 ft (2,928 m)
- Mount Tabayoc 9,252 ft (2,820 m)
- Mount Pual 8,940 ft (2,720 m)
- Mount Timbak 8,921 ft (2,719 m)
- Mount Kalawitan 8,904 ft (2,714 m)
- Mount Kapiligan 8,888 ft (2,709 m)
- Mount Amuyao 8,865 ft (2,702 m)
- Mount Panotoan 8,812 ft (2,686 m)
- Mount Alchan 8,586 ft (2,617 m)
- Mount Osdung 8,579 ft (2,615 m)
- Mount Napulauan 8,566 ft (2,611 m)
- Mount Babadak 8,537 ft (2,602 m)
- Mount Abao 8,517 ft (2,596 m)
- Mount Nangaoto 8,383 ft (2,555 m)
- Mount Bangbanglang 8,094 ft (2,467 m)
- Mount Sapocoy 8,068 ft (2,459 m)
- Mount Pawoi 8,051 ft (2,454 m)
- Mount Mausan 7,851 ft (2,393 m)
- Mount Camingingel 7,779 ft (2,371 m)
- Mount Sicapoo 7,746 ft (2,361 m)
- Mount Alimungao 7,746 ft (2,361 m)
- Mount Aki 7,717 ft (2,352 m)
- Mount Pauadan 7,697 ft (2,346 m)
- Mount Loco-ono 7,657 ft (2,334 m)
- Mount Binuluan 7,641 ft (2,329 m)
- Mount Data 7,580 ft (2,310 m)
- Mount Pack 7,530 ft (2,300 m)
- Mount Sipitan 7,503 ft (2,287 m)
- Mount Mengmeng 7,487 ft (2,282 m)
- Mount Matoni 7,444 ft (2,269 m)
- Mount Napalauan 7,408 ft (2,258 m)
- Mount Ambubungan 7,398 ft (2,255 m)
- Mount Santo Tomas 7,388 ft (2,252 m)
- Mount Guibul 7,379 ft (2,249 m)
- Mount Balait 7,254 ft (2,211 m)
- Mount Toyangan 7,234 ft (2,205 m)
- Mount Lacob-ti-duyog 7,234 ft (2,205 m)
- Mount Bayoyo 7,182 ft (2,189 m)
- Mount Palansa 7,116 ft (2,169 m)
- Mount Ugo 7,070 ft (2,150 m)
- Mount Masbit 7,060 ft (2,150 m)
- Mount Lamagan 7,008 ft (2,136 m)
- Mount Lobo 6,959 ft (2,121 m)
- Mount Damocnoc 6,959 ft (2,121 m)
- Mount Burnay 6,890 ft (2,100 m)
- Mount Tagpew 6,886 ft (2,099 m)
- Mount Puguis 6,867 ft (2,093 m)
- Mount Patapat 6,670 ft (2,030 m)
- Mount Yabnong 6,650 ft (2,030 m)
- Mount Kabuyao 6,644 ft (2,025 m)
- Mount Manmanoc 6,640 ft (2,020 m)
- Mount Polis 6,627 ft (2,020 m)
- Mount Bakoko 6,555 ft (1,998 m)
- Mount Awapanniki 6,539 ft (1,993 m)
- Carrot Peak 6,493 ft (1,979 m)
- Mount Lungod 6,302 ft (1,921 m)
- Mount Bayabas 6,270 ft (1,910 m)
- Mount Mating-oy 6,253 ft (1,906 m)
- Mount Poris 6,142 ft (1,872 m)
- Mount Oyayao 6,138 ft (1,871 m)
- Mount Patoc 6,119 ft (1,865 m)
- Mount Ulap 6,053 ft (1,845 m)
- Mount Atok 5,755 ft (1,754 m)
- Mount Ambaguio 5,633 ft (1,717 m)
- Mount Ampalauag 5,568 ft (1,697 m)
- Mount Binmaca 5,463 ft (1,665 m)
- Mount Yangbew 5,443 ft (1,659 m)
- Mount Lusod 5,384 ft (1,641 m)
- Mount Ananeto 5,361 ft (1,634 m)
- Mount Kotkot 5,289 ft (1,612 m)
- Mount Bumalayak 5,210 ft (1,590 m)
- Mount Dusong 5,098 ft (1,554 m)
- Mount Nazagarray 5,007 ft (1,526 m)
- Mount Talalang 4,990 ft (1,520 m)
- Mount Indalmogan 4,984 ft (1,519 m)
- Mount Inoman 4,823 ft (1,470 m)
- Mount Salat 4,741 ft (1,445 m)
- Mount Jamalapah 4,665 ft (1,422 m)
- Mount Puloy 4,557 ft (1,389 m)
- Mount Sagang 4,111 ft (1,253 m)
- Mount Binhagan 3,799 ft (1,158 m)
- Mount Santo Domingo 3,442 ft (1,049 m)
- Mount Mabittayon 2,080 ft (630 m)

=== Volcanoes ===
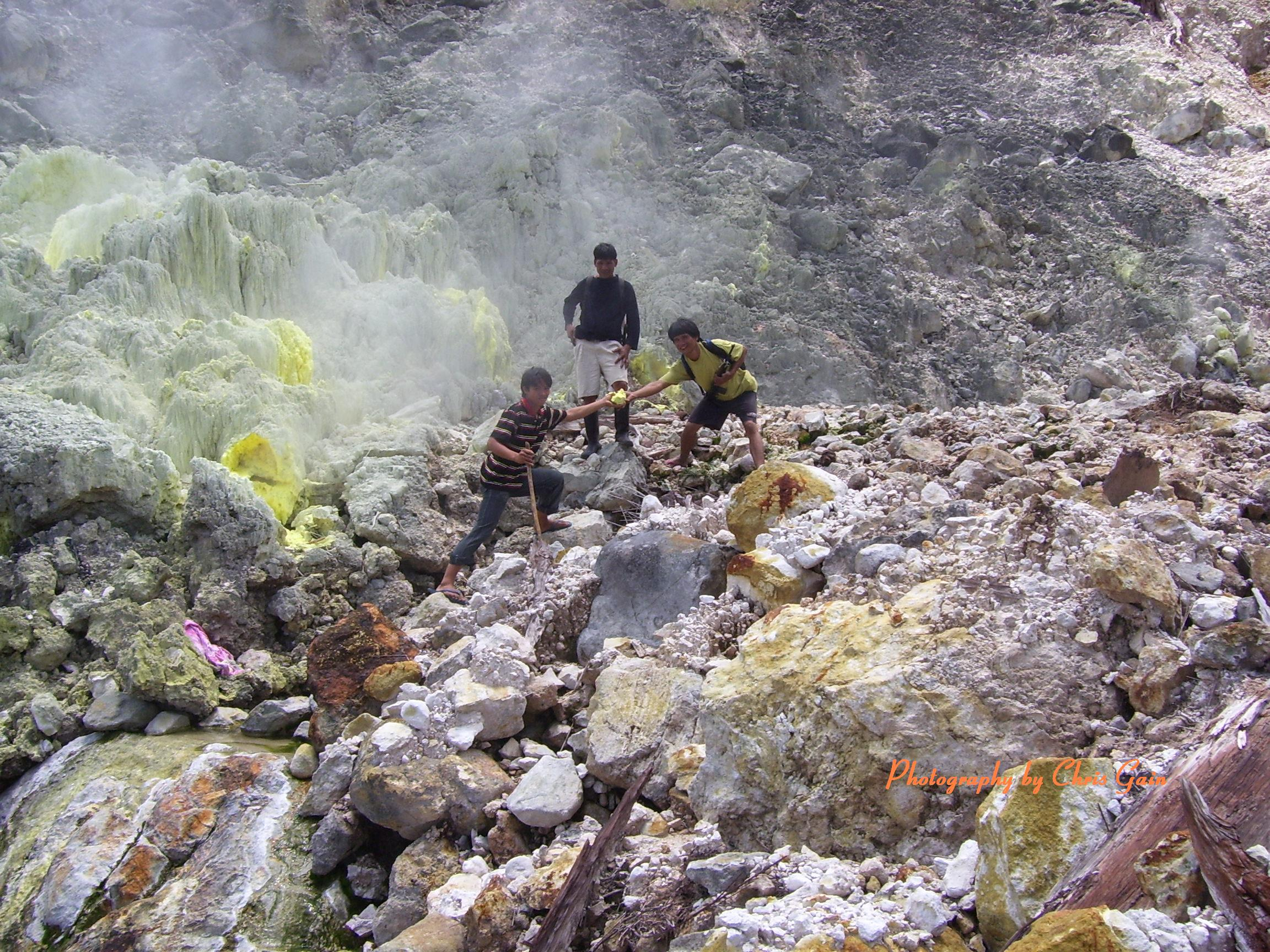
Djum-ag fumarole field # 2 on Mount Binuluan in Kalinga province, Philippines in 2008

Three volcanoes with no historical eruptions but still thermally active are located within the Cordillera Central:

- Mount Binuluan, 2,329-metre (7,641 ft) high in Kalinga province, has active solfataras and thermal springs.
- Mount Patoc, 1,865-metre (6,119 ft) high about 6 km (3.7 mi) north of Bontoc town proper in Mountain Province, has several thermal springs in Barangay Mainit, Bontoc, on the western slope of the mountain.
- Mount Santo Tomas, 2,252-metre (7,388 ft) high in Tuba, Benguet near Baguio, has Asin Hot Springs on its western slope.

=== Protected areas ===
- Balbalasang-Balbalan National Park
- Cassamata Hill National Park
- Lower Agno Watershed Forest Reserve
- Mount Data National Park
- Mount Pulag National Park
- Northern Luzon Heroes Hill National Park
- Upper Agno River Basin Resource Reserve

=== Waterfalls ===
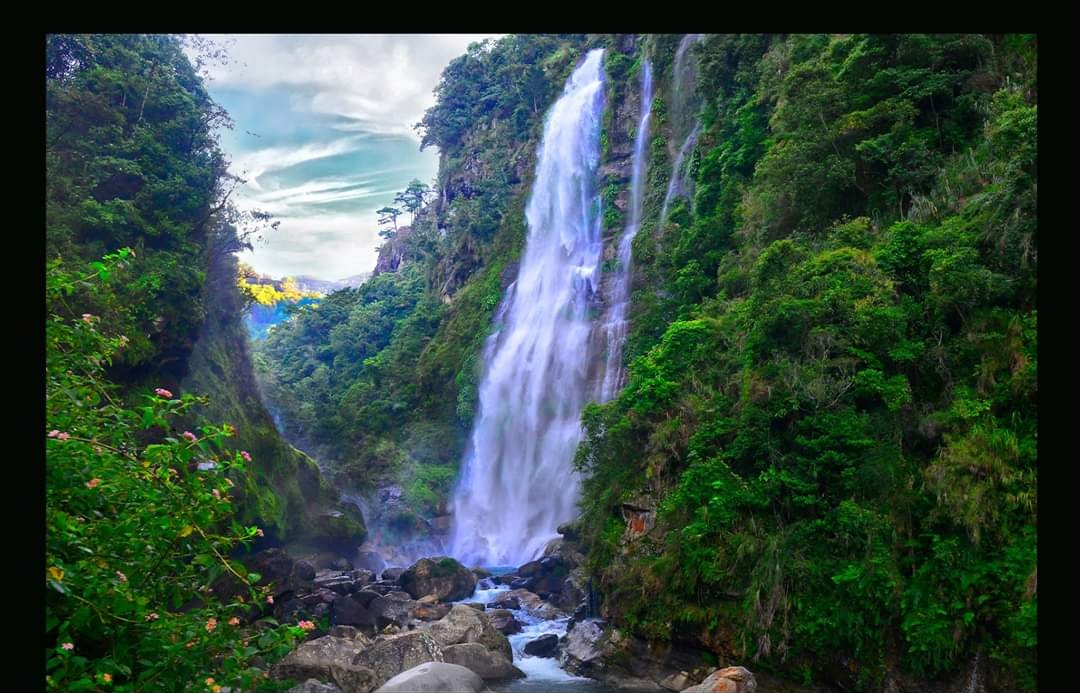
Bomod-ok Falls in Sagada

List of waterfalls in Cordillera:

- Balentimol Falls, Hungduan
- Binanga Falls, La Trinidad
- Bomod-ok Falls, Sagada
- Bridal Veil Falls, Tuba
- Hydro Falls, Tuba
- Kaparkan Falls, Tineg
- Pattan Falls, Bakun
- Pongas Falls, Sagada
- Pungit Falls, Tinglayan
- Tappiya Falls, Banaue
- Tenogtog Falls, Mayoyao
- Towing Falls, Sablan

== Environment ==
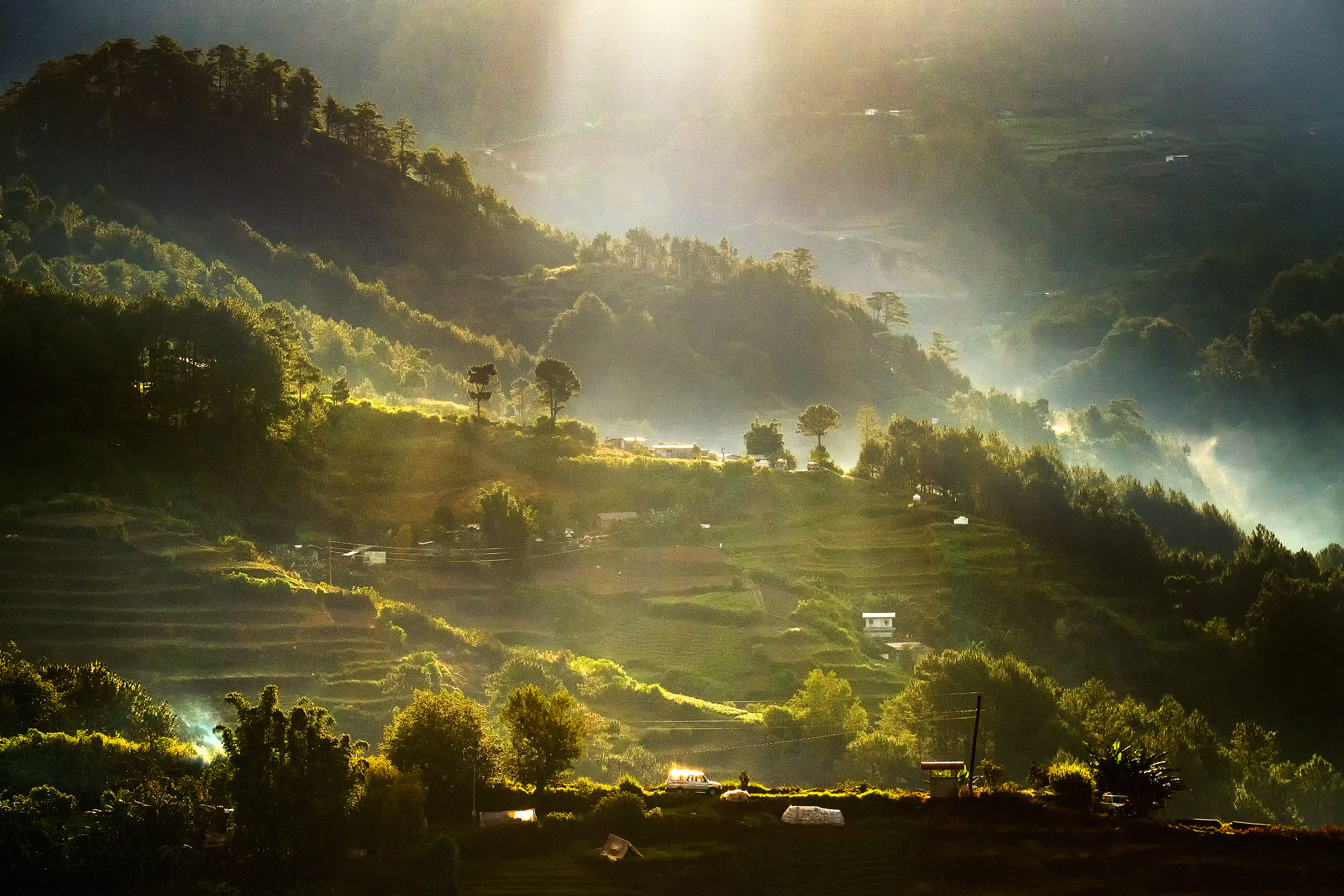
The range in Buguias, Benguet

The mountains support a number of different types of habitat. Elevations above 1,000 metres (3,300 ft) are covered in Luzon tropical pine forests of Benguet pine (Pinus insularis) except in the north of the range where the high slopes consist of Luzon montane rain forests. Elevations below 1000 meters are in the Luzon rain forests ecoregion.

Two major problems threaten the environment of the Cordillera: dam projects flood river valleys and remove habitat and also cause people to flee their houses and seek refuge in other areas; mining project destroy forest areas and also don't create wealth and resources for the upkeep of the tribal lands.

== People ==
=== Inhabitants ===
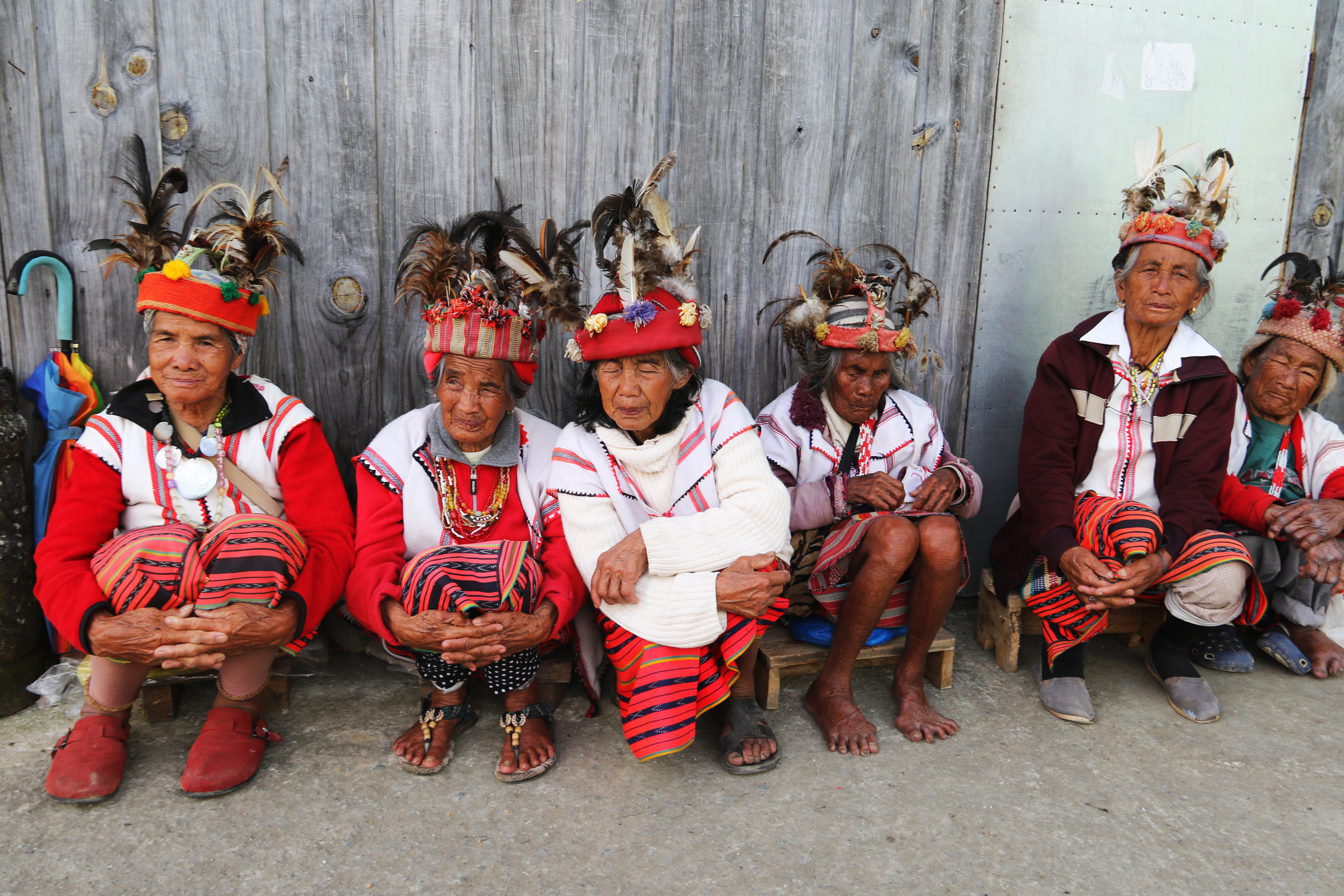
Elderly Ifugao women in traditional attire

Most of the Cordillera Central is the ancestral domain of the 'people of the mountains.' These ethno-linguistic groups include: Abra (Itneg), Apayao (Apayao), Benguet (Kankanaey and Ibaloi), Ifugao (Ifugao), Kalinga (Kalinga) and Mountain Province (Bontoc and Kankanaey). Each of these major ethno-linguistic groups has its own family of languages and cultures.

An alternative listing for the Northern Philippine tribes is: Apayao/Isnag, Abra/Tinguian, Kalinga, Gaddang, Applai, Bontoc, Bago, I-lagod, Kankana-ey, Kangkanai, Balangao, Ibaloi, Ifugao, Ikalahan, Kalanguya, Karao and Ilongot.

=== Culture and language ===
Beside their own tribal cultures, there is a Cordilleran culture which is largely molded by the geography of the Cordilleras, and their common heritage of resisting the invading imperial powers (Spain, United States, and Japan in the past – and after 1946 the central government in Manila is also regarded as such), including the continuing adverse encroachments by lowlanders.

== Economy ==
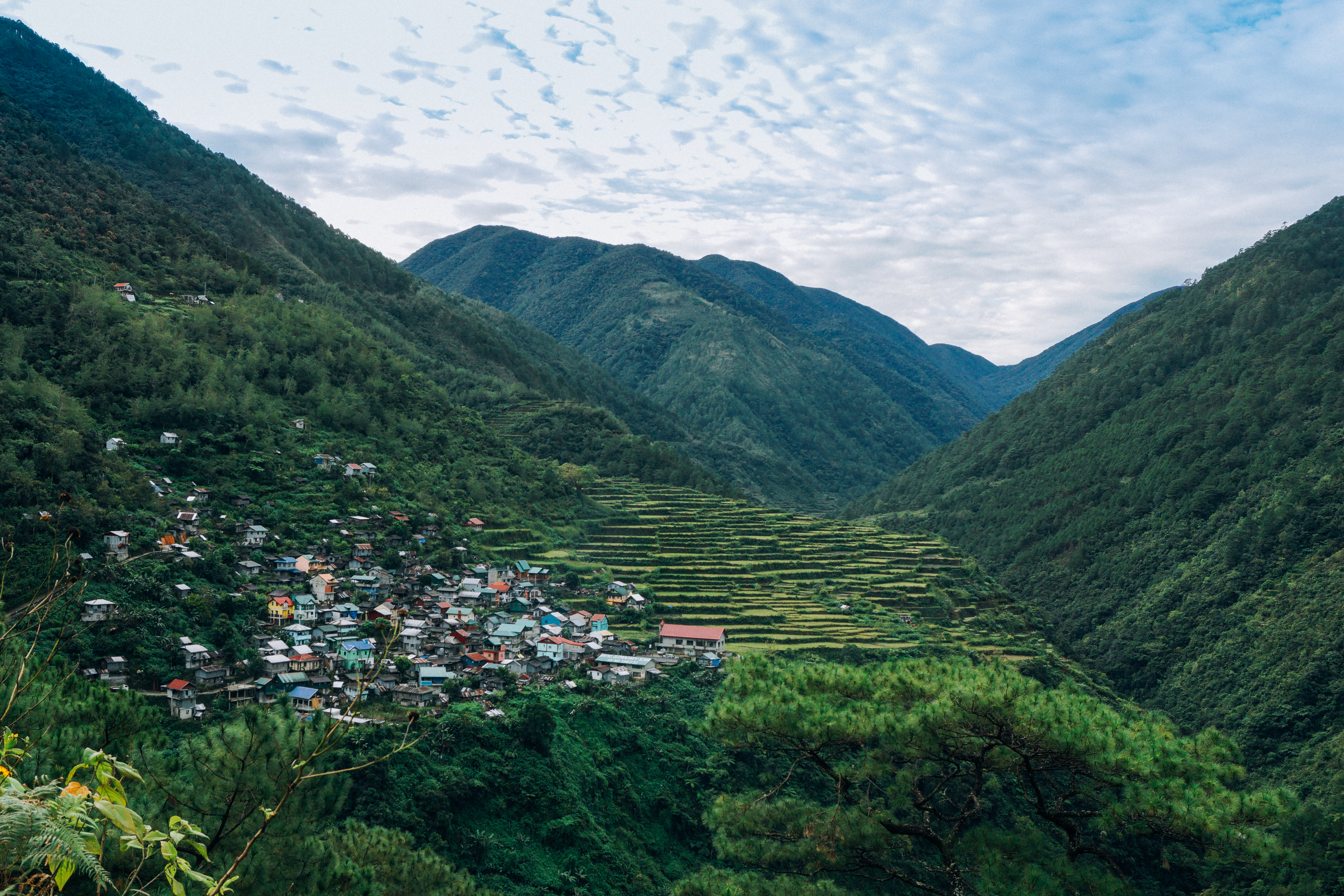
Bay-yo Rice Terraces and village at Bontoc, Mountain Province

The Cordillera Central is one of the country's richest regions in terms of natural resources, a major resource base of the Philippines. It contains 11% of the total area is agricultural rice fields, orchards, pig farms and pasture lands. 60% of the country's temperate vegetables are produced in the area. It is the country's premier mining district. There are eight big mining companies operating which are mostly foreign controlled. Some 80% of the total Philippine gold production comes from the Cordillera.

The range is also home to the headwaters of the major rivers in Northern Luzon, with several dams which include the Ambuklao and Binga in Benguet.

== History ==
The Philippines was already of interest to Spain before the Spaniards even reached the land. In 1565, reports of huge gold mines in the Cordillera reached the Viceroy of Mexico, which led to the first official Spanish expedition to the Cordillera in 1576. King Philip III, waging the Thirty Year War which needed funding, sent orders for large expeditions to the Philippines.

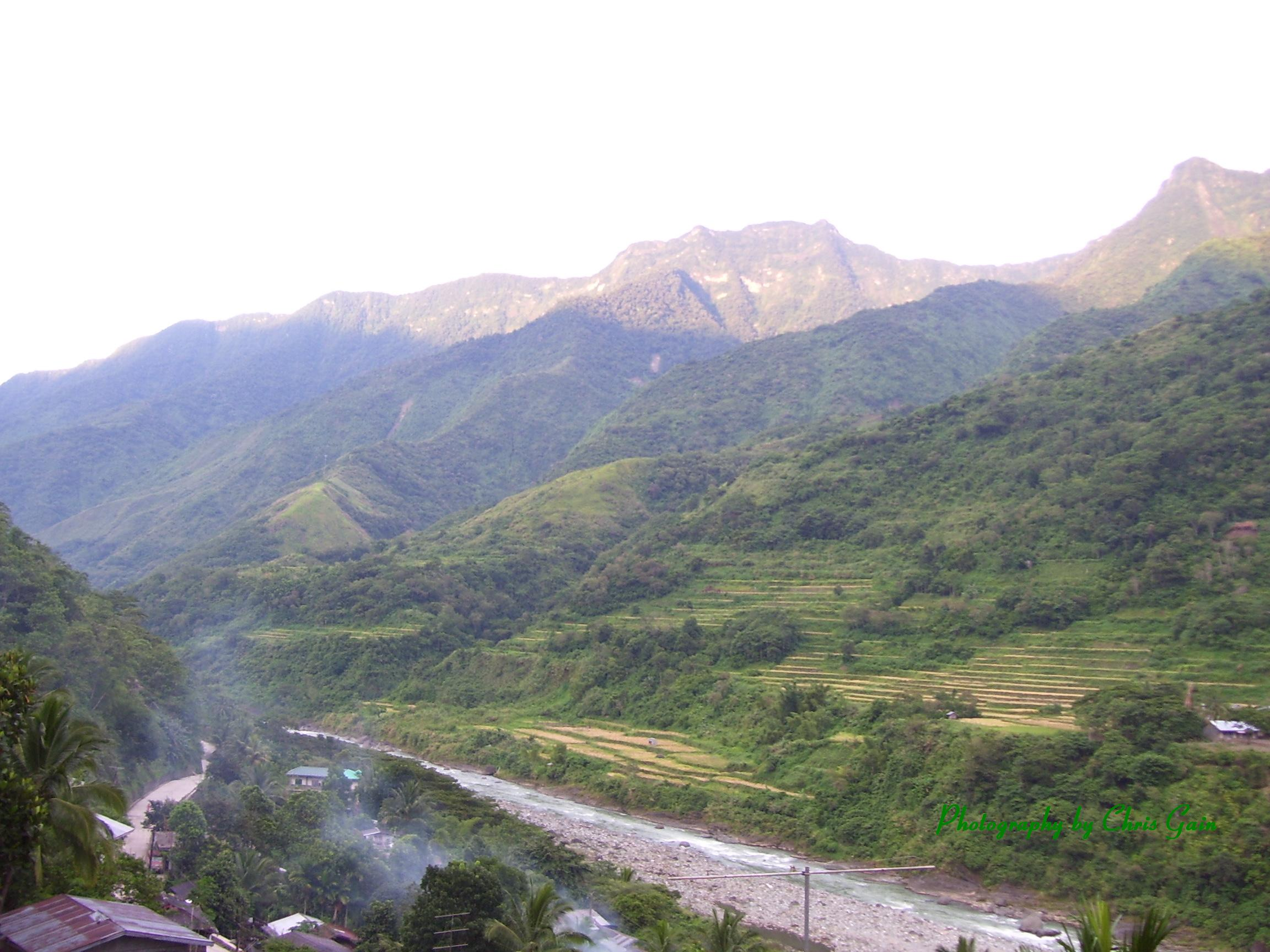
Sleeping Beauty mountain viewed from Poblacion, Tinglayan, in the Chico River valley in Kalinga

In 1620, Captain Garcia de Aldana Cabrera offered the resisting Igorot tribal leaders clemency if they were willing to accept Catholic religion, obey the Spanish government and pay a fifth of all their mined gold to the Spanish king. They refused and the Spanish conquerors built forts and organized military troops to start the exploitation of the gold mines.

During the years that followed, the Spanish managed to trade gold despite setbacks from the Igorots, who because of their resistance remained relatively independent from Spanish rule. The price that the Igorots had to pay for this independence was that they became different from their colonized brothers.

The Philippines staged Asia's first nationalistic revolution in 1896, and declared its independence on June 12, 1898. The newly founded country was soon taken over by the United States of America. The US was the first foreign nation to fully invade the highlands of the Cordillera to push the mining operations in the territory.

Spain relinquished control of the Philippines to the United States of America due to the Treaty of Paris of 1898, which officially ended the hostilities of the Spanish–American War. After a short period of peace in the region after the treaty was finalized the Philippine–American War began until 1902, though pockets of fighting did not end until 1913. The result of these conflicts led to the US declaring the Philippines a protectorate, a form of colonialism with local autonomy. The United States established strategic military bases in the Philippines with the consent of the established government in Manila. During World War II, the Japanese temporarily seized control of the Philippines. A combined effort between the American armed forces and the Philippine commonwealth military managed to successfully drive out the Japanese by 1945.

On September 27, 1927, the Benguet Consolidated Mining Company discovered one of the richest veins of gold ever, at a time when the US was entering the Great Depression. This was the start of a real gold rush into Cordillera region: in 1929, there were 94 mining companies, by 1933 there were 17,812.

This extreme growth had tremendous results for the landscape; it changed the original one way Mountain Trail into a busy highway despite the road slides and cuts that occur up to this day. Again, similar to the fight against the Spanish, the indigenous inhabitants protested against the destruction of their land and the neglecting of their rights. Mining operations continued to grow and by 1939 the Philippines ranked among the world's leading gold producers, and second to the state of California among US producers.

From 1936 to 1946, the Philippines was granted domestic self-administration under the Commonwealth of the Philippines as a transitional period for complete independence. From 1941 to 1945, the country fell under Japanese rule and was liberated by military forces of the United States of America, and dare inside by the combined forces of the Allied Philippine Commonwealth military forces and local Igorot and Cordilleran guerrilla forces in Northern Luzon. The US subsequently recognized Philippine independence on July 4, 1946.

The independent republic's policy shifted towards the integration of the 'cultural minorities' into mainstream culture. In 1966 the Philippine Congress passed the 'Separation Bill', dividing the old Mountain Province into four: Benguet, Mountain Province (Bontoc), Ifugao and Kalinga-Apayao. The political elite hoped that the creation of several provinces would, by increasing the region's representation, increase development spending in the area.

Under the Marcos' administration, politicization of the Cordillera took a new turn. National government development projects in the area were against the interests of the indigenous peoples, and were strongly resisted by them. Particularly important were the Chico River Dam project and the Cellophil project. The first threatened to inundate traditional villages, the second gave outsiders control over vast forest lands. Resistance resulted in increased regional consciousness rather than local ethnic consciousness.

In 1986 the dictatorship of Ferdinand Marcos was overthrown by the People Power Revolution of the Philippines and he was succeeded by Corazon Aquino.

However, the Aquino administration failed to tackle substantial issues such as land reform and the restructuring of the economy. After the collapse of the negotiations between the government and the National Democratic Front (NDF), Aquino declared the "Total War Policy", aimed at recovering New People's Army (NPA) controlled areas and to destroy the NPA's organizational and infrastructure base. The NPA had moved into the Cordillera to assist in the resistance against the projects.

== Biodiversity ==
The Giant bushy-tailed cloud rat (Crateromys schadenbergi), Large-toothed hairy-tailed rat (Batomys dentatus), and Cordillera hairy-tailed rat (Batomys granti) are species of large rodent endemic to Central Cordillera Range in Luzon, Philippines.

== Gallery ==
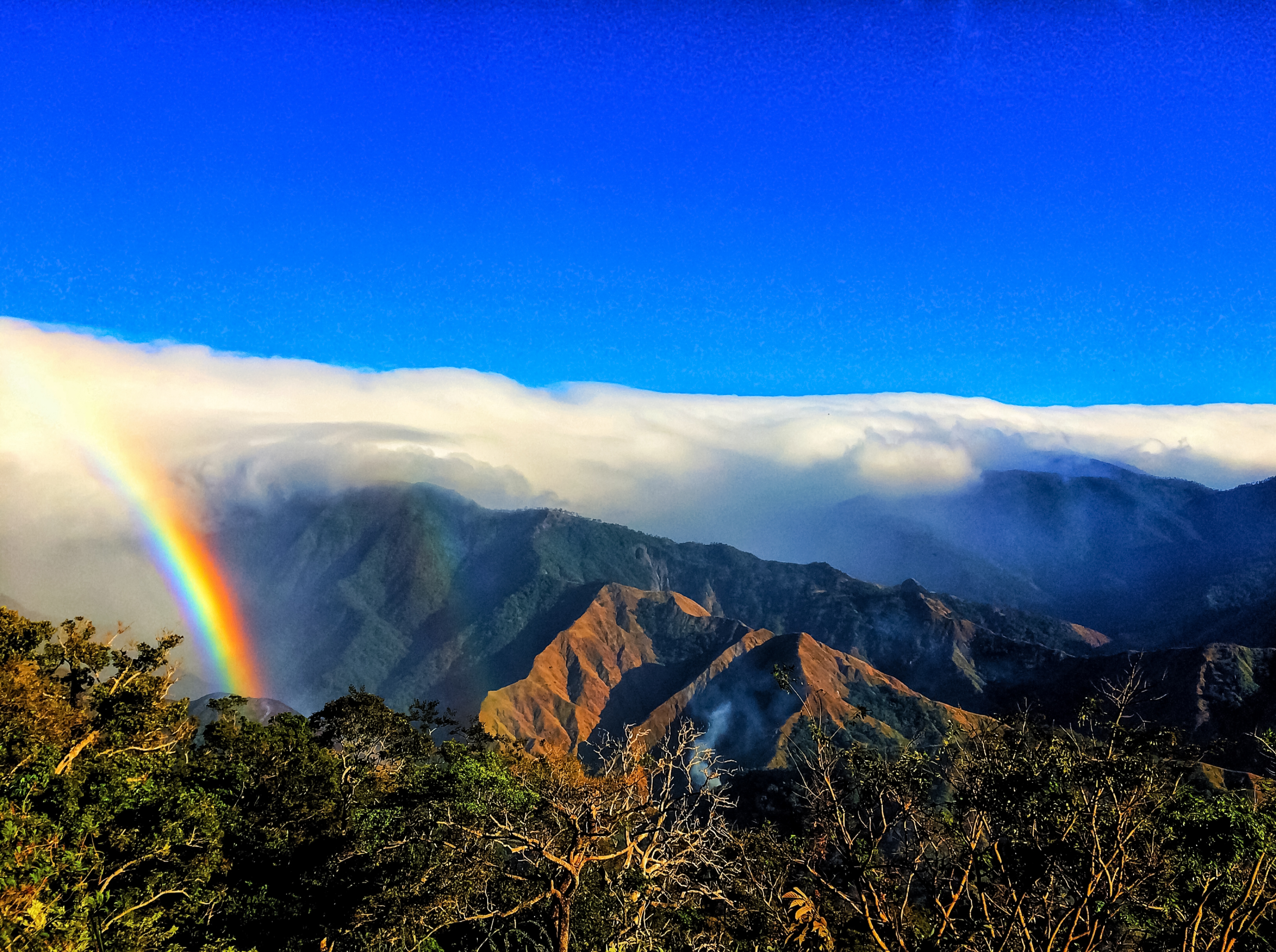
The range along Solsona-Apayao road in Ilocos Norte

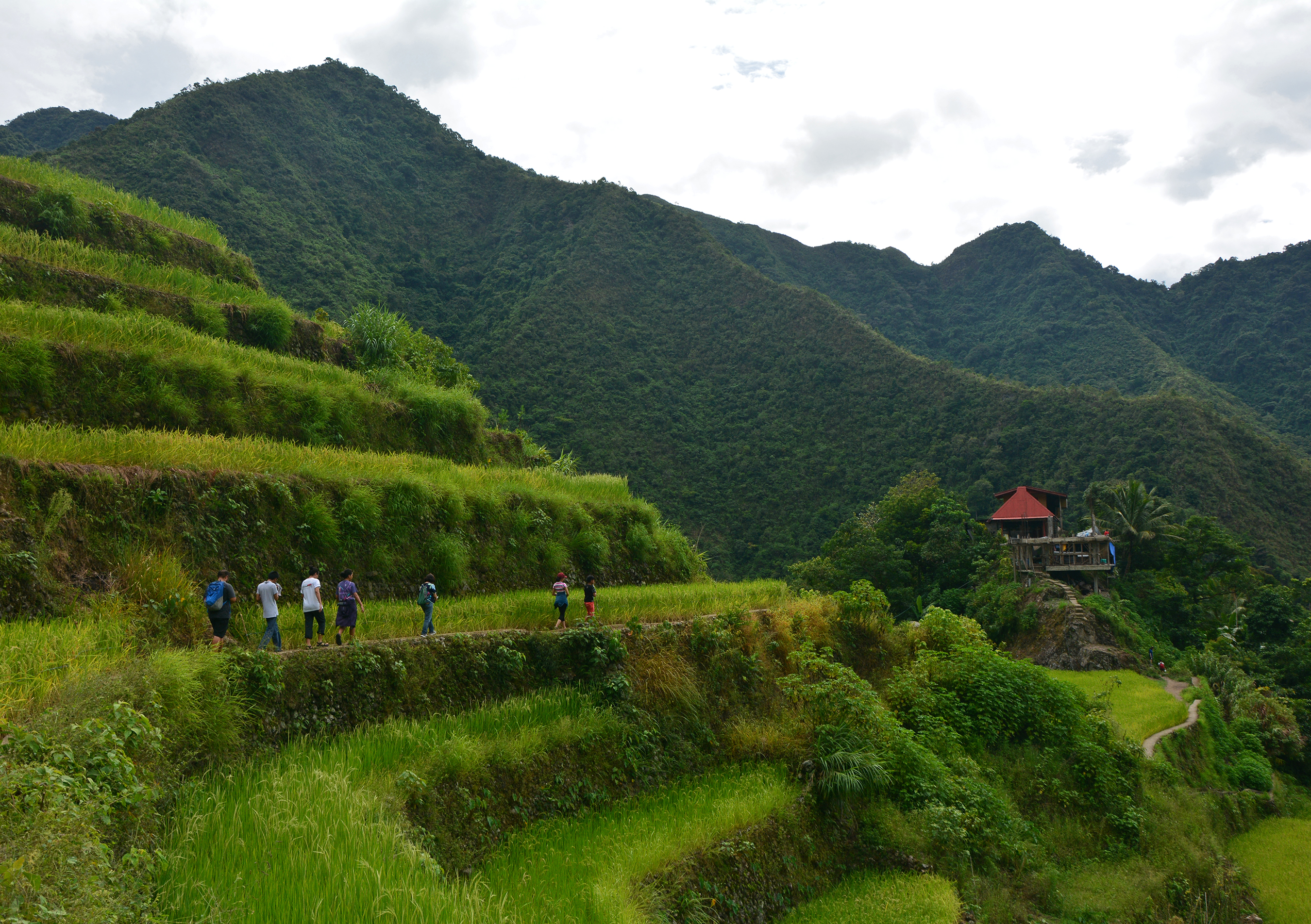
Rice paddies at Batad Rice Terraces in Banaue, Ifugao

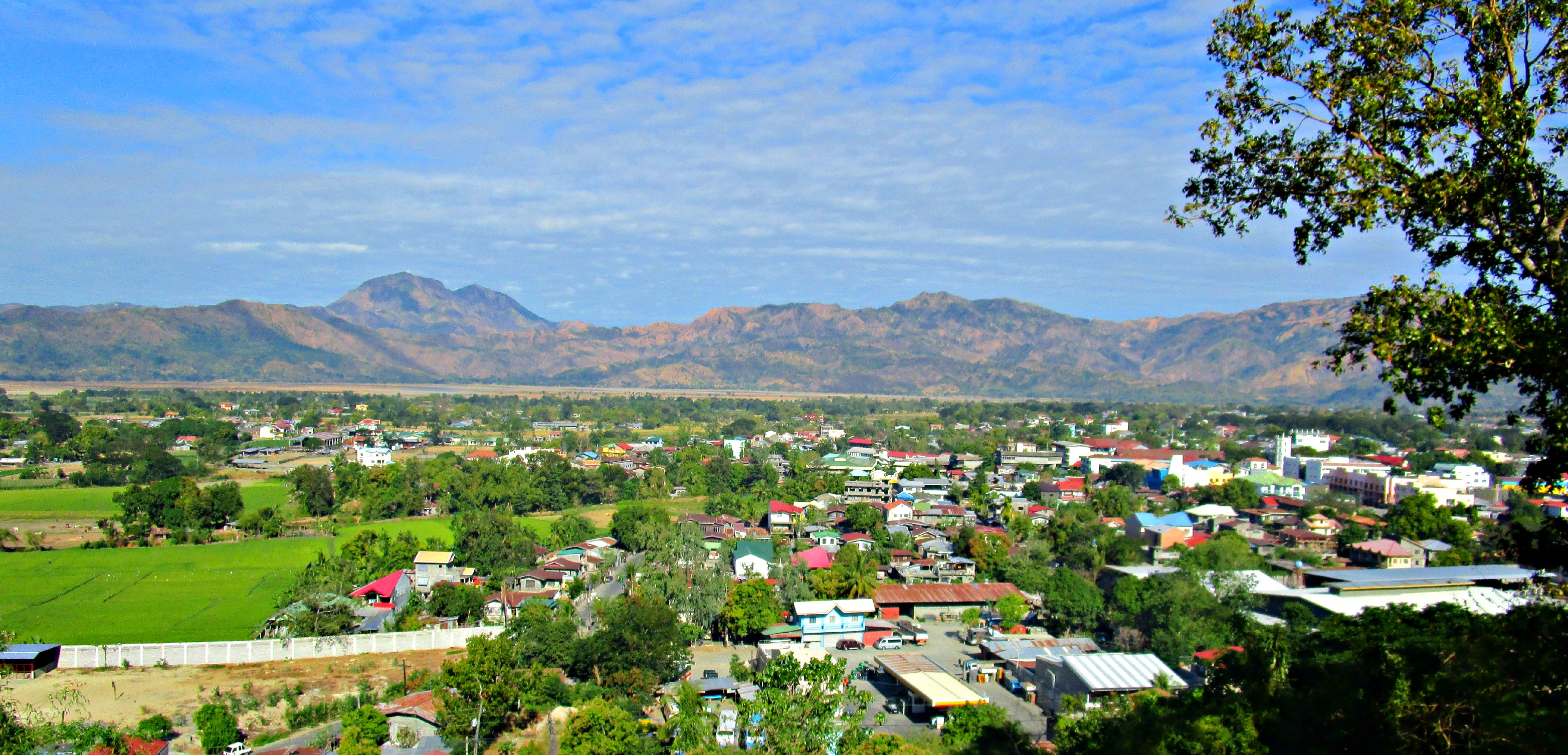
Overlooking the Abra Valley and Bangued, Abra

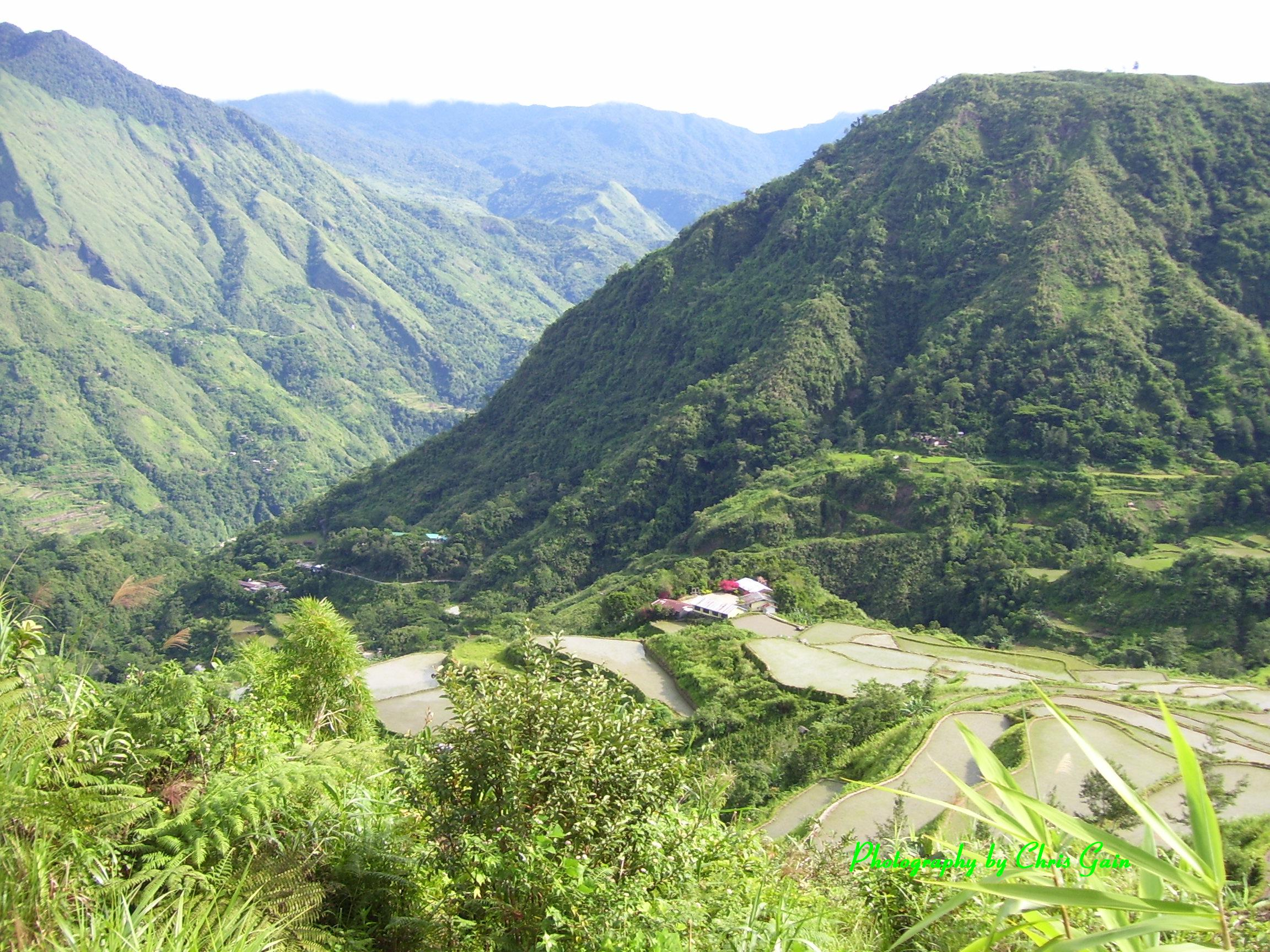
Pasil, Kalinga Valley, viewed from Ag‑gama to Duya‑as track

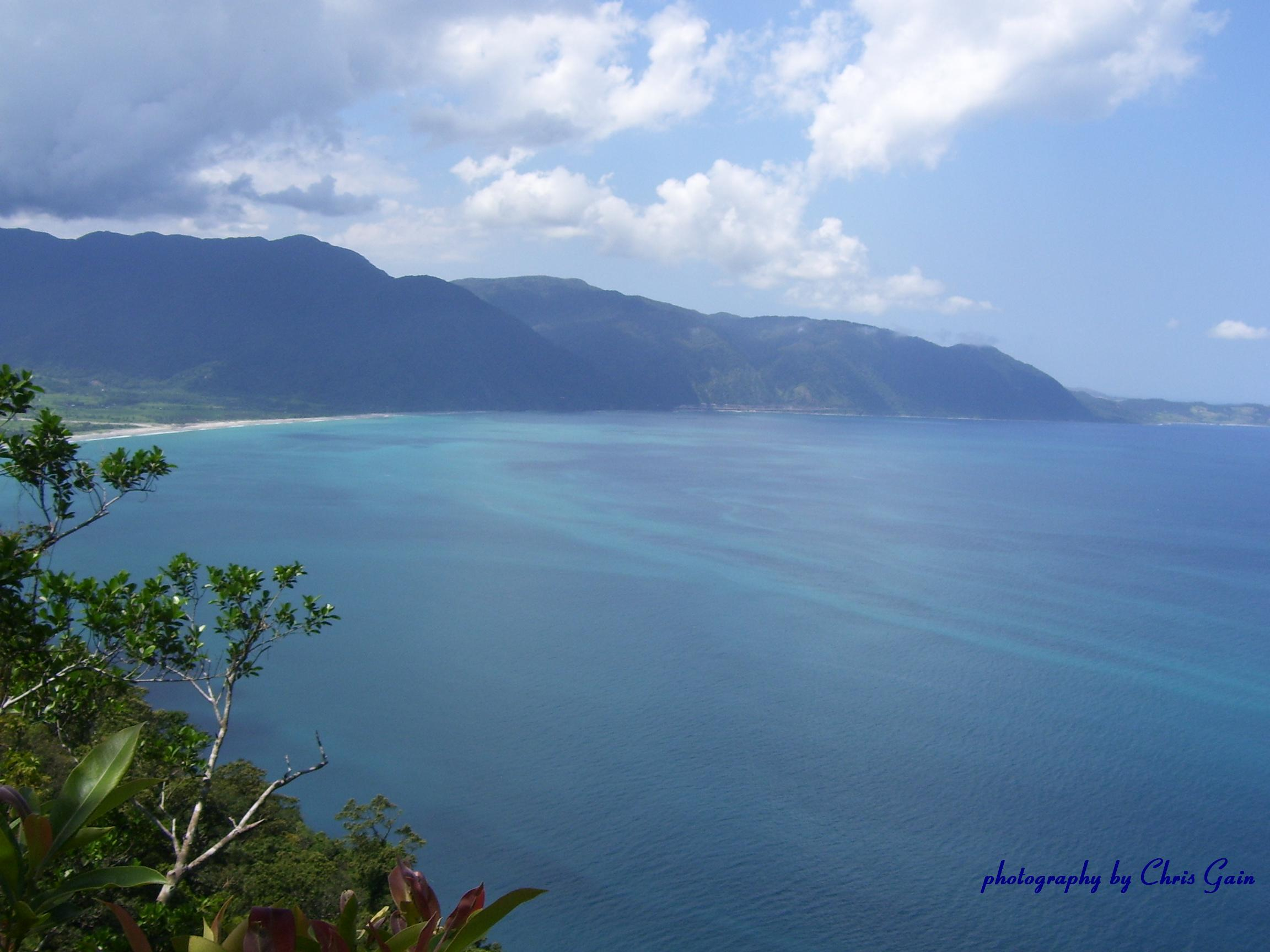
Pasaleng Bay in Ilocos Norte showing the northern terminus of the mountain range

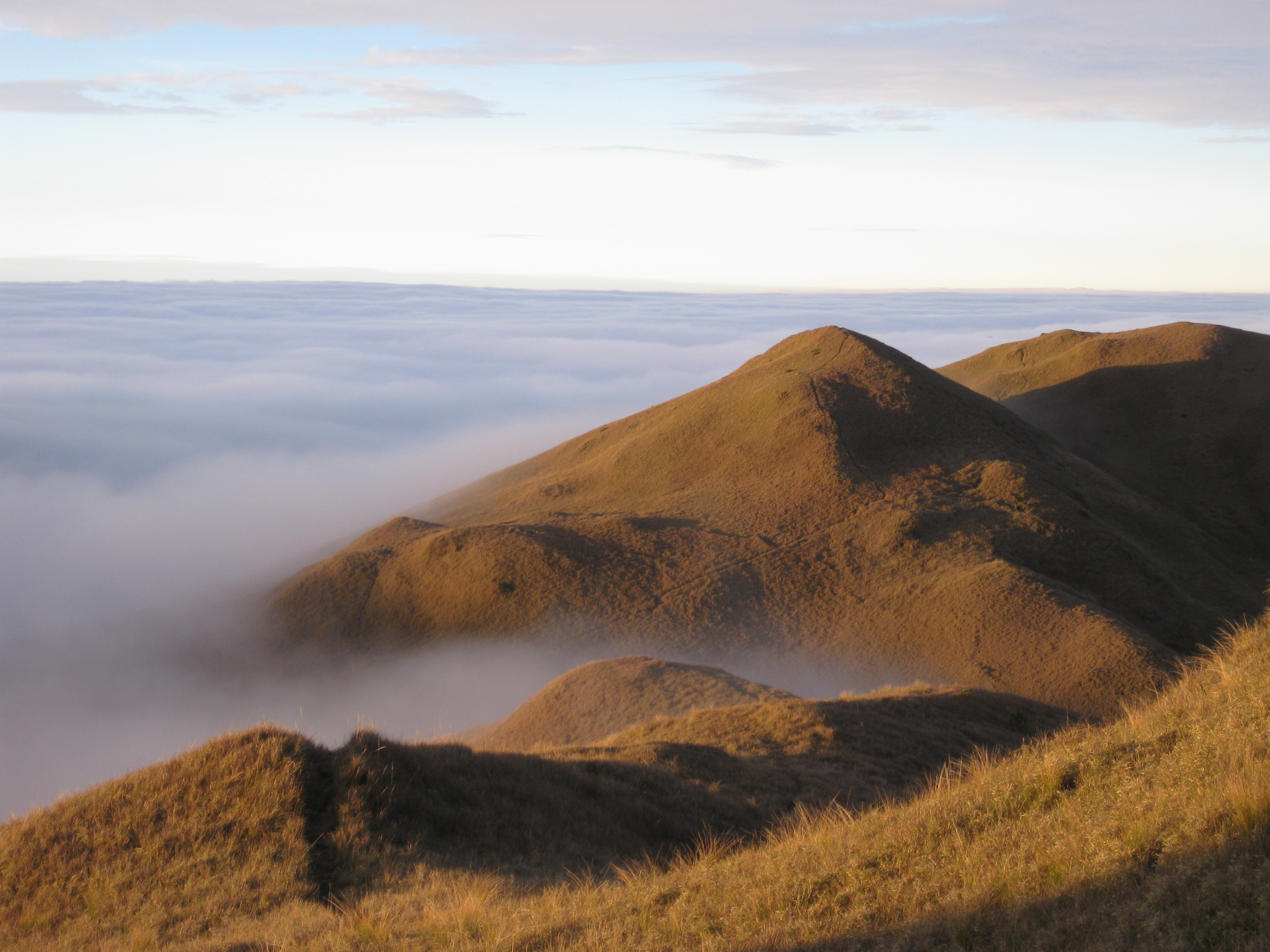
Mount Pulag summit and sea of clouds

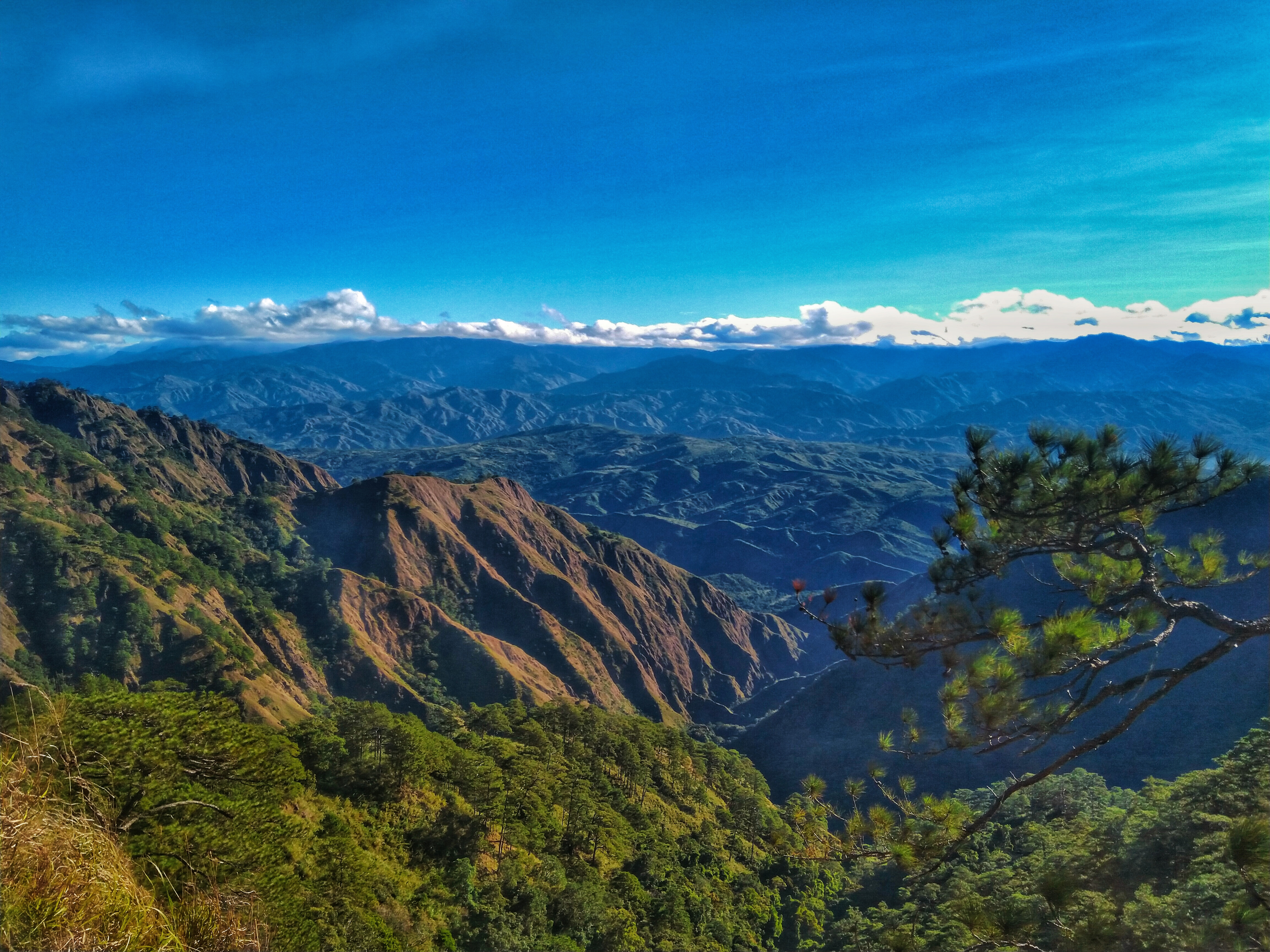
Kibungan, Benguet

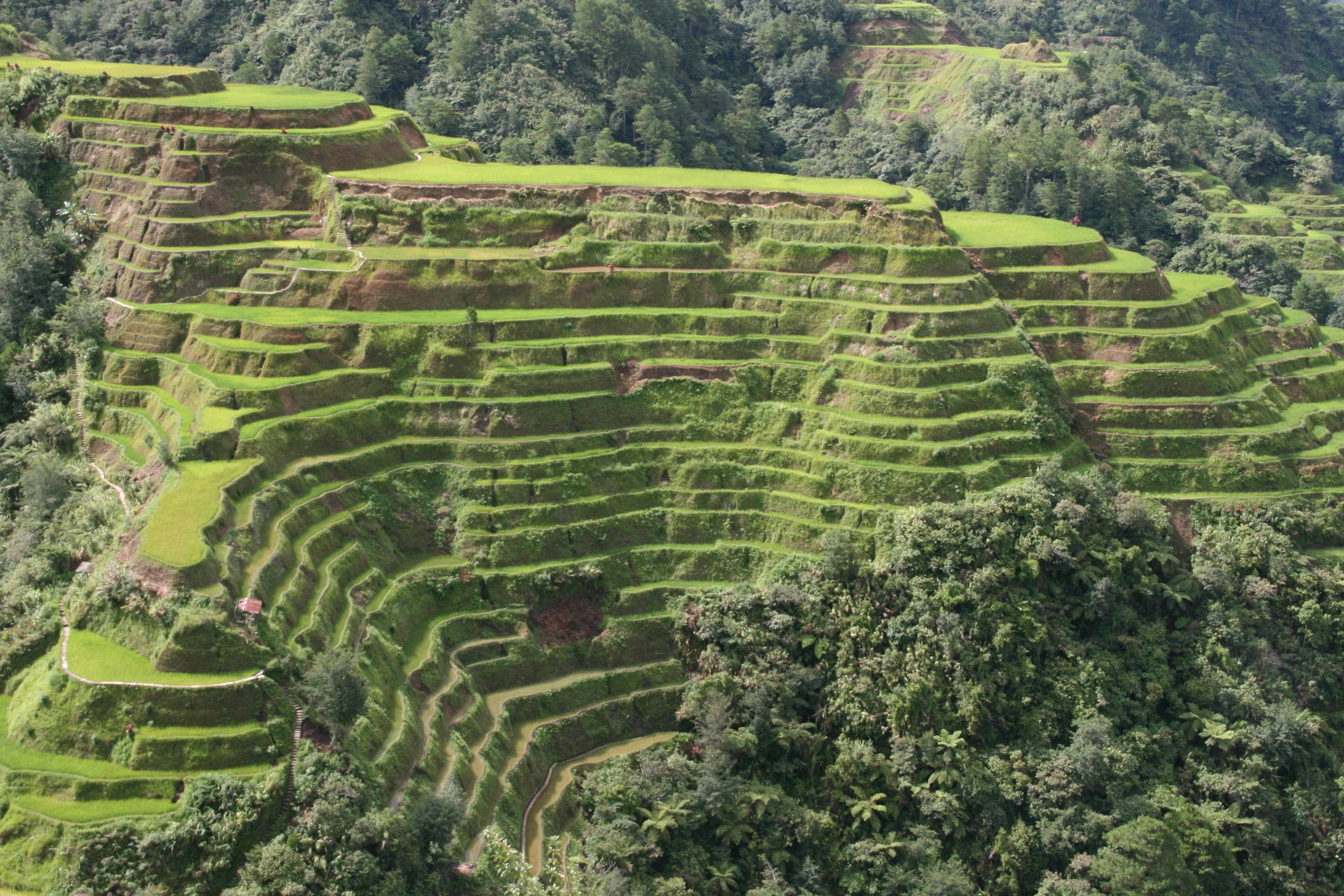
Banaue Rice Terraces
