= Mount Abao =

Mountain in Luzon, Philippines

- Location within Luzon Location within Philippines

Highest point
- Elevation: 2,596 m (8,517 ft)
- Prominence: 111 m (364 ft)
- Coordinates: 16°50′00″N 120°55′00″E

Geography
- Location: Luzon
- Country: Philippines
- Region: Cordillera Administrative Region
- Province: Mountain Province
- Parent range: Cordillera Central

Mount Abao is a mountain in the Philippines. It is located in Bauko, Mountain Province in Cordillera Central and the Cordillera Administrative Region, in the north of the country, 250 kilometres (160 mi) north of the national capital Manila.
