= Mount Patoc =

Stratovolcano in the Philippines

Patoc
- Location within Philippines

Highest point
- Elevation: 1,865 m (6,119 ft)
- Coordinates: 17°08′48″N 120°58′48″E

Geography
- Location: Luzon
- Country: Philippines
- State: Mountain Province
- Region: Cordillera Administrative Region
- Parent range: Cordillera Central

Geology
- Mountain type: Stratovolcano
- Volcanic arc: Luzon Volcanic Arc

Patoc is a strongly fumarolic stratovolcano in the Philippines. Patoc is located in Mountain Province, part of the Cordillera Central range, on the island of Luzon, in the Philippines. It is located 6 cadastral kilometres north of Bontoc, at latitude 17.147°N (17°8'48"N), longitude 120.98°E (120°58'48"E).

== Physical features ==
Elevation is reported as 1,865 metres (6,119 ft) above sea level, and is described by the Smithsonian Institution as displaying strong fumarolic activity.

A stream and village on the west side are named Mainit (a Tagalog word for "hot"). There are hot springs at the village of Mainit, one of which has been successfully commercialised for tourists. There is also a village on the south side called Favarey.

== Eruptions ==
There are no reports of eruptions.

== Geology ==
Rock type is predominantly andesite.

== Listings ==
The Smithsonian Institution's Global Volcanism Program lists Patoc as strongly fumarolic. The Philippine Institute of Volcanology and Seismology (PHIVOLCS) has not listed Patoc or any volcanic related activity at this location.

== See also ==
- List of active volcanoes in the Philippines
- List of potentially active volcanoes in the Philippines
- List of inactive volcanoes in the Philippines
- Philippine Institute of Volcanology and Seismology
- Pacific ring of fire
