= List of mountains in the Philippines =

The following is an incomplete list of mountains in the Philippines. Several of these are volcanoes, formed by subducting tectonic plates surrounding the archipelago.

== List ==
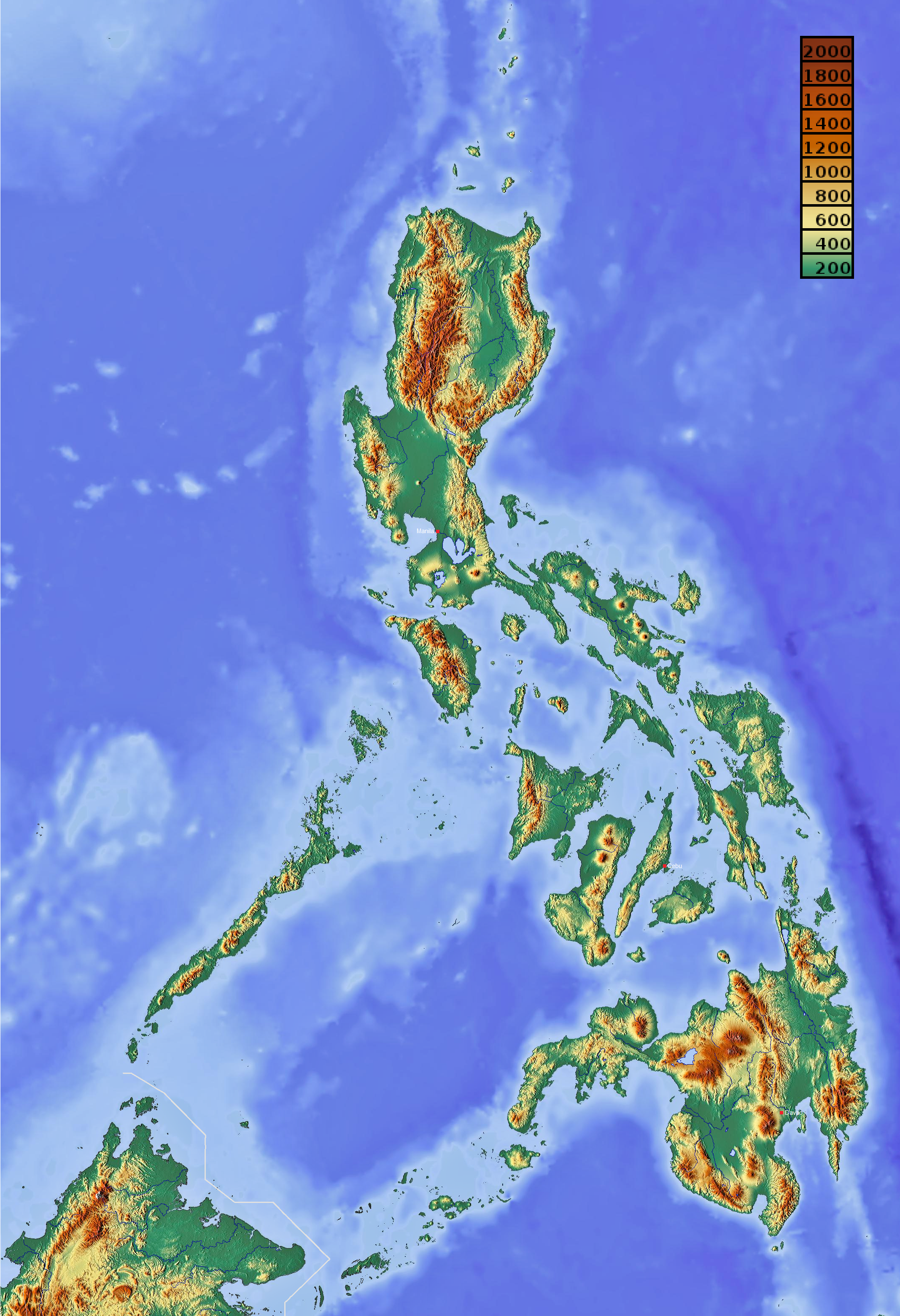
Terrain of the Philippines

This list contains most of the highest mountains in the country. It is limited to mountain peaks with, if known, an elevation of at least 200 metres (660 feet) above sea level, and may include those considered as hills. The distinction between a hill and a mountain in terms of elevation is unclear and largely subjective, but a hill is universally considered to be less tall and less steep than a mountain.

- Name: mountains are sorted according to only names (without the "Mount" prefix) for easier reference in name and spelling variants. Unnamed peaks are italicized. (note: to minimize clutter, citations for names are limited only to mountains with variant names, spellings, and/or those that currently do not have elevation data)
- Elevation: sorted in meters above sea level (note: Some mountains may contain several different elevations that may conflict with each other. Each of these are supported by their own provided sources).
- Province(s) covered: Some mountains are situated within two or more provinces borders. "Lanao" and "Davao" entries, which were derived from the Philippine Institute of Volcanology and Seismology website, are italicized since they are no longer provinces.
- Coordinates: sorted according to latitude. Several of these (most especially volcanoes) were provided by the PHIVOLCS website). Others were derived mostly from the OpenStreetMap (OSM) database (released under the Open Database License), and a few from GeoNames (released under the Creative Commons attribution license).
- Notes: if a volcano, may contain the type, as classified by the PHIVOLC

| | ultra prominent peak (with topographic prominence greater than 1,500 metres (4,900 feet)) |
| | ultra prominent peak and highest in the island |
| ‡ | active volcano (erupted within historical times (within the last 600 years) |
| † | potentially-active volcano (morphologically young-looking but with no historical records of eruption) |
| | no data or inactive/extinct volcano (no record of eruptions; physical form is being changed by agents of weathering and erosion) (check "Notes" section) |

| Name (Alternate/ variant name) | | Elevation (m.a.s.l.) | Prominence (m.a.s.l.) | Province(s) covered | Mountain range/ volcanic belt | Coordinates | Notes |
|---|---|---|---|---|---|---|---|
| Mount Abao | | 2,662 m (8,734 ft), 2,527 m | 111 m (364 ft) | Ifugao | Cordillera Central | 16°50′00″N 120°55′00″E | |
| Mount Abunug | | 600 m (2,000 ft) | | Southern Leyte | | 11°02′00″N 124°42′00″E | Inactive volcano |
| Mount Agad-Agad | | | | Lanao del Norte | | 8°10′46″N 124°17′24″E | Located in Iligan City |
| Mount Agamomata | | 1,554 m (5,098 ft) | | Apayao | Cordillera Central | 18°09′17″N 120°58′04″E | |
| Mount Aganmala | | 1,786 m (5,860 ft) | | Ilocos Norte | Cordillera Central | 18°15′39″N 120°53′56″E | |
| Mount Agtuuganon | | 1,652 m (5,420 ft) | | Davao Oriental | | 7°46′53″N 126°12′21″E | |
| Mount Agustin | | 334 m (1,096 ft) | 57 m (187 ft) | Camarines Sur | | 13°33′50″N 122°59′23″E | |
| Mount Aja | | 463 m (1,519 ft) | | Nueva Ecija | | 15°47′57″N 121°08′00″E | |
| Akir-akir Volcano | | 526 m (1,726 ft) | | Maguindanao del Norte | | 7°25′16″N 124°25′27″E | Inactive volcano |
| Mount Al-al | | 2,663 m (8,737 ft) | | Benguet | Cordillera Central | | |
| Mount Alchanon | | 2,617 m (8,586 ft) | 1,297 m (4,255 ft) | Kalinga | Cordillera Central | 17°15′02″N 120°58′09″E | |
| Alto Peak (Mount Aminduen) | | 1,325 m (4,347 ft) | 1,325 m (4,347 ft) | Leyte | | 11°06′17″N 124°44′30″E | Highest in Leyte Island. |
| Mount Amanayao | | | | Benguet | Cordillera Central | | |
| Mount | | 1,714 m (5,623 ft) | | Mountain Province | Cordillera Central | | |
| Mount Amuyao | | 2,701 m (8,862 ft), 2,702 m | 839 m (2,753 ft) | Mountain Province | Cordillera Central | 17°00′41″N 121°07′46″E | Highest point in Mountain Province. |
| Mount Ambalatungan | | 2,329 m (7,641 ft) | | Kalinga | | 17°19′00″N 121°06′00″E | Inactive volcano. (May refer to Mount Binuluan). |
| Mount Amicay | | | | Bohol | | 9°46′00″N 124°16′00″E | |
| Mount Amorong | | 376 m (1,234 ft) | | Pangasinan | | 15°50′16″N 120°48′23″E | Inactive volcano (lava dome) |
| Mount Ampalauag | | 1,714 m (5,623 ft) | | Ifugao | Cordillera Central | 17°01′43″N 121°17′56″E | |
| Mount Ampaoid | | 1,066 m (3,497 ft) | | Zamboanga del Norte | | 7°55′00″N 125°40′40″E | Inactive volcano |
| Mount Ampiro | | 1,532 m (5,026 ft), 1,556 m | | Misamis Occidental | | 8°22′45″N 123°37′17″E | Inactive volcano |
| Mount Anacuao | | 1,852 m (6,076 ft), 1,853 m | | Aurora, Quezon | Sierra Madre | 16°15′14″N 121°53′22″E | |
| Angelo Mountains | | 1,316 m (4,318 ft) | | Laguna | | 14°49′56″N 121°22′07″E | |
| Mount Annaguan | | 1,400 m (4,600 ft) | 1,400 m (4,600 ft) | Cagayan | | 17°51′50″N 121°20′40″E | Located in Rizal, Cagayan |
| Mount Apanderang | | | | Benguet | Cordillera Central | | |
| Mount Apo | † | 2,954 m (9,692 ft), 2,938 m | 2,954 m (9,692 ft) | Davao del Sur, Cotabato | Apo–Talomo Mountain range | 6°59′16″N 125°16′10″E | Highest mountain in Mindanao and the Philippines' highest peak. Potentially active stratovolcano. |
| Mount Aquiting | | 523 m (1,716 ft) | | Leyte | | 10°51′58″N 124°51′00″E | Inactive volcano |
| Mount Bilbao | | 1,026 m (3,366 ft), 1,030 m | | Pampanga | None (solitary peak) | 15°12′19″N 120°44′34″E | |
| Mount Ascuero | | 1,266 m (4,154 ft) | | Leyte | | 11°32′00″N 124°35′00″E | Inactive volcano |
| Mount Atimbia (Atimba) | | 654 m (2,146 ft) | | Laguna | | 14°09′00″N 121°21′58″E | Inactive volcano |
| Mount Atok | | 1,770 m (5,810 ft), 1,769 m | | Benguet/ Mountain Province | Cordillera Central | 16°34′00″N 120°41′00″E | |
| Mount Awapanniki | | | | Nueva Vizcaya | | 16°27′00″N 120°56′00″E | |
| Babuyan Claro Volcano (Mount Pangasun) | ‡ | 1,080 m (3,540 ft), 843 m | | Cagayan | | 19°31′26″N 121°56′49″E | Active stratovolcano, last erupted 1917 |
| Mount Baca | | 752 m (2,467 ft) | | Nueva Ecija | | 15°23′38″N 121°12′21″E | |
| Mount Bacauan | | 1,824 m (5,984 ft) | | Zamboanga del Sur | | 7°35′00″N 123°15′00″E | Inactive volcano |
| Mount Baco | | 2,489 m (8,166 ft), 2,488 m, 2,364 m | 1,574 m (5,164 ft) | Occidental Mindoro | | 12°48′20″N 121°08′36″E | |
| Mount Bagacay | | 775 m (2,543 ft) | | Camarines Norte | Bicol Volcanic Belt | 14°13′00″N 122°49′30″E | Inactive volcano |
| Mount Bagsak | | 1,142 m (3,747 ft) | | Sulu | | 5°53′00″N 125°33′58″E | Inactive volcano |
| Mount Bahaoan | | | | Agusan del Sur | | 8°13′18″N 125°22′19″E | |
| Mount Balait | | 2,200 m (7,200 ft) | | Apayao, Abra | Cordillera Central | 17°25′29″N 120°59′44″E | Located near the Apayao-Abra border. |
| Mount Balikabok (Mount Balakibok) | | 849 m (2,785 ft), 843 m | | Zambales | Zambales Mountains | 14°55′46″N 120°19′48″E | Inactive volcano |
| Mount Balatubat | | 828 m (2,717 ft) | | Batanes | | 18°57′00″N 121°55′59″E | Inactive volcano |
| Mount Balatukan (Balatucan) | | 2,450 m (8,040 ft), 2,560 m, 2,328 m | 1,883 m (6,178 ft) | Misamis Oriental | | 8°46′00″N 124°59′00″E | Inactive compound volcano |
| Mount Balik Sampan | | | | Tawi-Tawi | | 5°12′31″N 120°03′27″E | |
| Mount Balingkilat (Pointed Peak) | | 1,071 m (3,514 ft) | | Zambales | Zambales Mountains | 14°51′20″N 120°07′41″E | |
| Mount Balintingon | | 838 m (2,749 ft) | | Nueva Ecija | | 15°15′52″N 121°13′09″E | |
| Balo Dome | | 873 m (2,864 ft) | | South Cotabato | | 6°18′30″N 125°10′16″E | Inactive volcano |
| Balokon Mountain | | | | Davao | | | |
| Mount Baloy (Baloy‑Daku) | | 1,728 m (5,669 ft), 2,149 m | | Antique, Capiz | | 11°08′47″N 122°15′12″E | |
| Mount Balungao | | 382 m (1,253 ft) | | Pangasinan | | 15°52′00″N 120°41′00″E | Inactive volcano |
| Balut Volcano | † | 862 m (2,828 ft) | | Davao | | 5°24′00″N 125°22′30″E | Potentially active stratovolcano |
| Banahao de Lucban | | 1,875 m (6,152 ft) | | Quezon, Laguna | | 14°04′00″N 121°30′00″E | Inactive volcano |
| Mount Banahaw (Banahao) | ‡ | 2,177 m (7,142 ft), 2,169 m, 2,158 m, 2,188 m | 1,919 m (6,296 ft) | Laguna, Quezon | | 14°04′03″N 121°29′32″E | Active complex stratovolcano, last erupted 1843. Located near the Laguna-Quezon border. |
| Mount Banoy | | 987 m (3,238 ft) | | Batangas | | | |
| Mount Bangbang | | 1,533 m (5,030 ft) | | Apayao / Mountain Province | Cordillera Central | 17°40′09″N 121°15′12″E | |
| Mount Balbalasang | | 2,454 m (8,051 ft), 2,467 m, 2,464 m | 428 m (1,404 ft) | Abra, Kalinga | Cordillera Central | 17°19′10″N 120°55′27″E | |
| Mount Bangcay | | 406 m (1,332 ft) | | Nueva Ecija | | 15°47′00″N 120°44′00″E | Inactive volcano |
| Mount Banti | | | | Abra | Cordillera Central | 17°40′32″N 120°35′36″E | |
| Mount Banton (also known as Mount Amponggo) | | 596 m (1,955 ft) | | Romblon | | 12°55′00″N 122°04′00″E | Inactive volcano |
| Mount Baonao | | 485 m (1,591 ft) | | Leyte | | 11°26′00″N 124°29′00″E | Inactive volcano |
| Base Peak | | 598 m (1,962 ft) | | South Cotabato | | 6°14′48″N 125°08′51″E | Inactive volcano |
| Mount Basilan | | 971 m (3,186 ft) | | Basilan | | 6°33′00″N 122°04′00″E | Inactive volcano |
| Mount Bataan | | 1,421 m (4,662 ft) | | Bataan | | 14°30′38″N 120°28′33″E | Highest in the province. |
| Mount Batelian | | 620 m (2,030 ft) | | Zamboanga del Sur | | 7°29′00″N 123°11′00″E | Inactive volcano |
| Batorampon Point | | 1,335 m (4,380 ft) | | | | 7°4′25.0″N 122°01′23.3″E | Highest mountain in Zamboanga City. |
| Mount Batulao | | 692 m (2,270 ft), 693 m | | Batangas, Cavite | | 14°02′24″N 120°48′09″E | Inactive volcano |
| Mount Baya | | 1,379 m (4,524 ft) | | Lanao del Sur | | 7°47′14″N 124°05′44″E | Inactive volcano |
| Mount Bayabas | | 433 m (1,421 ft) | | Camarines Norte | | 14°01′34″N 122°45′16″E | |
| Mount Bayaguitos | | 316 m (1,037 ft) | | Laguna | | 14°10′00″N 121°24′00″E | Inactive volcano |
| Bee Hive Peak | | 808 m (2,651 ft) | | South Cotabato | | 6°09′16″N 125°23′30″E | Inactive volcano |
| Mount Bernacci (Tangcong Vaca) | | 756 m (2,480 ft) | 694 m (2,277 ft) | Camarines Sur | | 13°36′36″N 122°58′10″E | |
| Bigain Hill | | 464 m (1,522 ft) | | Batangas | | 13°54′N 121°03′E | Inactive volcano |
| Mount Bigong | | 770 m (2,530 ft) | | Zamboanga del Sur | | 7°51′15″N 123°17′00″E | Inactive volcano |
| Biliran Volcano | | 1,340 m (4,400 ft), 1,301 m | | Biliran | | 11°31′23″N 124°32′06″E | Volcano island, cone (active; last erupted 1939 Sept. 26) |
| Mount Binaca | | 1,004 m (3,294 ft) | | Cotabato | | 6°57′00″N 124°01′00″E | Inactive volcano |
| Mount Binangonan | | 1,091 m (3,579 ft) | | Quezon | Sierra Madre | 14°38′00″N 121°33′00″E | |
| Mount Binhagan | | 1,172 m (3,845 ft) | | Ifugao | Cordillera Central | 16°48′39″N 121°11′14″E | |
| Mount Binmaca | | 1,787 m (5,863 ft) | | Ilocos Sur, Mountain Province, Benguet | Cordillera Central | 16°40′48″N 120°36′05″E | Located near the Ilocos Sur-Benguet border. |
| Mount Bintuod | | 1,935 m (6,348 ft) | | Nueva Vizcaya | | 17°18′22.4″N 121°5′38.6″E | |
| Mount Binuluan | | 2,329 m (7,641 ft), 2,328 m, 2,292 m | | Kalinga | Cordillera Central | 17°18′23″N 121°05′38″E | Inactive volcano. (May refer to "Mount Ambalatungan"). |
| Mount Bitanjuan | | 1,183 m (3,881 ft) | | Southern Leyte | | 10°21′53″N 125°04′22″E | |
| Mount Bitaogon | | 501 m (1,644 ft) | | Romblon | | | |
| Mount Bitinan | | 215 m (705 ft) | | Sulu | | 6°04′00″N 121°26′30″E | Inactive volcano |
| Mount Bito | | 1,058 m (3,471 ft) | | Cotabato | | 7°30′00″N 124°17′00″E | Inactive volcano |
| Mount Blik | | 1,198 m (3,930 ft) | | Cotabato | | 6°57′30″N 124°13′00″E | Inactive volcano |
| Mount Boctong | | 271 m (889 ft) | | Palawan | | 11°09′30″N 120°58′00″E | Inactive volcano |
| Mount Bolokbok | | 457 m (1,499 ft) | | Nueva Ecija | | 15°50′05″N 121°04′02″E | |
| Mount Bonbon | | 247 m (810 ft) | | Palawan | | 10°54′00″N 121°04′00″E | Inactive volcano |
| Mount Borogyod | | 378 m (1,240 ft) | | Aurora | Sierra Madre | 16°19′47″N 122°10′28″E | |
| Mount Bosa | | 2,083 m (6,834 ft) | | South Cotabato | | 6°05′53″N 124°42′27″E | Inactive volcano |
| Mount Buagan | | 1,771 m (5,810 ft) | | Abra/ Mountain Province | Cordillera Central | 17°30′54″N 121°02′09″E | |
| Bubongna Mountain | | | | Benguet | Cordillera Central | | |
| Mount Buboy | | 215 m (705 ft) | | Laguna | mountainrange | Inactive volcano | |
| Mount Bucas | | 450 m (1,480 ft) | | Lanao del Norte | | 8°05′03″N 123°51′40″E | Inactive volcano |
| Bud Dajo | | 620 m (2,030 ft), 811 m | | Sulu | | 6°0′48″N 121°03′24″E | Cinder cone volcano (active; last erupted 1897) |
| Mount Buga | | 549 m (1,801 ft) | | Zamboanga del Sur | | 7°36′00″N 123°16′00″E | Inactive volcano |
| Mount Bulalo | | 525 m (1,722 ft), 624 m | | Laguna | | 14°06′04″N 121°13′34″E | Inactive volcano |
| Mount Bulan | | 329 m (1,079 ft) | | Sulu | | 6°08′00″N 121°50′00″E | Inactive volcano |
| Mount Bulbul | | | | Benguet | Cordillera Central | 16°42′N 120°51′E | |
| Mount Bulibu | | 565 m (1,854 ft) | | Zamboanga del Sur | | 7°42′15″N 123°10′30″E | Inactive volcano |
| Bulusan Volcano (Mount Bulusan) | | 1,559 m (5,115 ft), 1,565 m, 1,560 m | 1,547 m (5,075 ft) | Sorsogon | Bicol Volcanic Belt | 12°46′09″N 124°03′23″E | stratovolcano formed inside a caldera (active; last erupted 2010 Nov.-2011 Feb.); Highest in Sorsogon province. |
| Bunsulan Hills | | 360 m (1,180 ft) | | Laguna | | 14°02′00″N 121°14′30″E | Inactive volcano |
| Mount Burburungan | | 963 m (3,159 ft) | | Occidental Mindoro | | 13°22′58″N 120°46′09″E | |
| Mount Burnay | | 2,115 m (6,939 ft) | | Ilocos Norte/Abra | Cordillera Central | | |
| Mount Busa | | 2,030 m (6,660 ft), 2,083 m | 1,661 m (5,449 ft) | Sarangani, South Cotabato | | 6°07′07″N 124°41′00″E | |
| Mount Butay | | 679 m (2,228 ft) | | Camiguin | | 9°07′00″N 124°46′00″E | Inactive volcano |
| Mount Butung | | 684 m (2,244 ft) | | Bukidnon | | 7°45′00″N 125°05′00″E | Inactive volcano |
| Cabalian Volcano | † | 945 m (3,100 ft) | | Southern Leyte | | 10°17′13″N 125°13′25″E | Potentially active stratovolcano |
| Mount Cabaluyan | | 284 m (932 ft) | | Pangasinan | | 15°42′00″N 120°20′00″E | Inactive volcano |
| Mount Cabugao | | 812 m (2,664 ft) | | Cotabato/Lanao | | 7°32′30″N 124°14′00″E | Inactive volcano |
| Mount Caburauan | | 473 m (1,552 ft) | | Albay | | 13°04′00″N 123°20′00″E | |
| Mount Cabuyao (Kabuyao) | | over 2,000 m | | Benguet | Cordillera Central | 16°21′34″N 120°33′53″E | |
| Mount Cadig | | 690 m (2,260 ft) | | Quezon, Camarines Norte | | 14°09′05″N 122°26′39″E | Located near the Quezon-Camarines Norte border. |
| Cagua Volcano | ‡ | 1,160 m (3,810 ft), 1,100 m, 1,133 m, 1,158 m | | Cagayan | Sierra Madre | 18°13′18″N 122°06′54″E | stratovolcano (active; last erupted 1907) |
| Mount Cahelietan | | 280 m (920 ft) | | Pangasinan | | 15°42′00″N 120°19′00″E | Inactive volcano |
| Mount Calabugao | | 1,864 m (6,115 ft) | | Bukidnon | | 8°34′00″N 125°07′00″E | Inactive volcano |
| Mount Caladang (Calandang) | | 1,465 m (4,806 ft), 1,468 m | | Quezon, Laguna, Rizal | Sierra Madre | 14°49′00″N 121°21′00″E | |
| Mount Calavite | | 1,521 m (4,990 ft), 1,522 m | 1,462 m (4,797 ft) | Occidental Mindoro | | 13°28′40″N 120°24′06″E | Highest in Occidental Mindoro province. |
| Mount Candalaga | | 2,268 m (7,441 ft) | 872 m (2,861 ft) | Davao de Oro | | 7°17′44″N 126°11′45″E | |
| Mount Kalawitan (Cauitan) | | 2,713 m (8,901 ft) | 709 m (2,326 ft) | Ifugao | Cordillera Central | 16°57′39″N 120°58′14″E | |
| Mount Calayan | | 499 m (1,637 ft) | | Cagayan | | 19°19′00″N 121°28′00″E | Inactive volcano |
| Mount Calibugon | | 1,442 m (4,731 ft) | | Palawan | | 8°59′05″N 117°51′50″E | |
| Calinigan Mountains | | 904 m (2,966 ft) | | Camarines Sur | | 13°45′57″N 123°40′24″E | |
| Mount Calomutan | | 631 m (2,070 ft) | | Sorsogon | | 12°36′09″N 123°59′22″E | |
| Camiguin de Babuyanes | ‡ | 712 m (2,336 ft) | | Cagayan | | 18°50′00″N 121°51′36″E | stratovolcano (active; last erupted 1857) |
| Mount Camingingel | | 2,283 m (7,490 ft), 2,364 m | | Ilocos Sur, Abra, Mountain Province | Cordillera Central | 17°11′07″N 120°52′08″E | Located near the Ilocos Sur-Abra-Mountain Province tripoint |
| Mount Campana | | 676 m (2,218 ft) | | Camiguin | | 9°12′30″N 124°42′30″E | Inactive volcano |
| Mount Canandag | | 432 m (1,417 ft) | | Leyte | | 11°58′00″N 124°25′00″E | Inactive volcano |
| Mount Cancanajag | † | 900 m (3,000 ft) | | Leyte | | 11°01′14″N 124°47′10″E | Potentially active stratovolcano |
| Mount Caniapasan | | 594 m (1,949 ft) | | Iloilo | | 11°06′00″N 122°45′59″E | |
| Mount Cantoloc | | 819 m (2,687 ft) | | Leyte | | 10°18′00″N 125°13′00″E | Inactive volcano |
| Mount Capinyayan | | 980 m (3,220 ft) | | Biliran | | 11°35′00″N 124°30′00″E | Inactive volcano |
| Mount Capotoan | | 850 m (2,790 ft) | | Samar | | 12°09′10″N 124°56′06″E | Highest in Samar Island. |
| Mount Capual | | 312 m (1,024 ft) | | Sulu | | 6°02′00″N 121°25′00″E | Inactive volcano |
| Mount Caraycaray | | 437 m (1,434 ft) | | Biliran | | 11°40′00″N 124°26′00″E | Inactive volcano |
| Mount Cariliao (Cariliao Volcano) | | 656 m (2,152 ft) | | Batangas | | 14°07′00″N 120°46′00″E | Inactive volcano |
| Mount Carling | | 800 m (2,600 ft) | | Camiguin | | 9°13′00″N 124°40′01″E | Inactive volcano |
| Mount Carranglan | | 633 m (2,077 ft) | | Nueva Ecija | | 15°56′00″N 121°02′00″E | |
| Mount Casiama | | 1,539 m (5,049 ft) | | Ilocos Norte | Cordillera Central | 18°08′35″N 120°56′56″E | |
| Mount Catala | | 606 m (1,988 ft), 585 m | | Marinduque | | 13°19′17″N 121°53′29″E | |
| Mount Cataluan | | 1,315 m (4,314 ft) | | Apayao | Cordillera Central | 18°26′11″N 121°00′17″E | |
| Mount Catmon | | 1,624 m (5,328 ft), 624 m | | Lanao del Norte | | 8°10′51″N 124°06′55″E | Inactive volcano |
| Mount Caual | | 2,105 m (6,906 ft) | | Benguet, Nueva Vizcaya | Cordillera Central | 16°27′00″N 120°53′00″E | Located near the Benguet-Nueva Vizcaya border. |
| Mount Cayudungan | | 1,465 m (4,806 ft) | | Ilocos Norte, Abra | Cordillera Central | 17°53′14″N 120°43′49″E | |
| Mount Cetaceo | | 1,833 m (6,014 ft) | | Cagayan | Sierra Madre | 17°42′N 122°03′E | |
| Mount Chumanchil | | 2,029 m (6,657 ft) | | Kalinga | Cordillera Central | 17°14′38″N 121°03′48″E | |
| Cinco Picos | | 929 m (3,048 ft) | | Zambales | Zambales Mountains | 14°47′27″N 120°09′45″E | |
| Cleopatra Needle | | 1,608 m (5,276 ft), 1,593 m | 1,582 m (5,190 ft) | Palawan | | 10°07′26″N 118°59′43″E | |
| Mount Codiapi | | 413 m (1,355 ft) | | Quezon | | 13°23′00″N 122°34′00″E | |
| Mount Coloumotan | | 602 m (1,975 ft) | | Sorsogon | | 12°35′00″N 123°58′00″E | Inactive volcano |
| Mount Cone (Culasi Peak) | | 959 m (3,146 ft), 422 m | | Camarines Norte | | 13°55′00″N 123°01′00″E | Inactive volcano |
| Conical Peak | | 686 m (2,251 ft) | | Catanduanes | | 13°51′N 124°09′E | |
| Mount Costa Rica | | 394 m (1,293 ft) | | Leyte | | 11°56′00″N 124°19′00″E | Inactive volcano |
| Mount Cresta (Crista) | | 1,672 m (5,486 ft), 1,670 m | | Isabela | Sierra Madre | 17°18′36″N 122°05′08″E | |
| Mount Cuadrado (Quadrado) | | 1,324 m (4,344 ft) | | Zambales | Zambales Mountains | 15°01′50″N 120°21′43″E | |
| Mount Cudtingan (Cudting) | | 466 m (1,529 ft) | | Siquijor | | 9°15′00″N 123°35′00″E | |
| Cuernos de Negros (Talinis Peak) | † | 1,903 m (6,243 ft), 1,860 m | | Negros Oriental | | 9°14′39″N 123°10′40″E | Potentially active stratovolcano. Negros Island's 2nd highest peak. |
| Mount Dagot | | 1,311 m (4,301 ft) | | Abra | Cordillera Central | 17°50′35″N 120°42′07″E | |
| Mount Culangalan | | 360 m (1,180 ft) | | Sorsogon | | 12°42′00″N 123°56′00″E | Inactive volcano |
| Mount Culasi | | 387 m (1,270 ft) | | Camarines Norte | | 13°53′45″N 123°05′15″E | Inactive volcano |
| Mount Cuyapo | | 209 m (686 ft) | | Nueva Ecija | | 15°48′00″N 120°40′00″E | Inactive volcano |
| Mount Daclan | | 1,500 m (4,900 ft) | | Benguet | Cordillera Central | 16°31′16″N 120°48′42″E | Inactive volcano |
| Mount Dagumbaan | | 1,127 m (3,698 ft) | | South Cotabato | | 7°49′00″N 124°56′45″E | Inactive volcano |
| Mount Dakes (Shekes) | | | | Benguet | Cordillera Central | | |
| Dakiwagan Mountain | | | | Benguet | Cordillera Central | | |
| Mount Dakula | | 399 m (1,309 ft) | | Sulu | | 5°58′54″N 121°10′42″E | Inactive volcano |
| Mount Dakut | † | 474 m (1,555 ft) | | Sulu | | 5°44′01″N 120°54′15″E | Potentially active volcano |
| Mount Dalimonoc | | 1,686 m (5,531 ft) | | Nueva Vizcaya/ Isabela | | 15°58′30″N 121°14′32″E | |
| Mount Dalupiri | | 275 m (902 ft) | | Cagayan | | 19°03′N 121°45′E | Inactive volcano. Located in Dalupiri Island. |
| Mount Danao (Danao Peak) | | 683 m (2,241 ft) | | Cebu | | 10°33′17″N 123°58′20″E | |
| Mount Danao | | 699 m (2,293 ft) | | Leyte | | 11°04′00″N 124°41′00″E | Inactive volcano |
| Mount Dapiak | | | | Zamboanga del Sur, Zamboanga del Norte | | 8°13′32″N 123°25′33″E | |
| Mount Data | | 2,310 m (7,580 ft), or 2810 m | | Mountain Province, Benguet | Cordillera Central | 16°52′51″N 120°50′57″E | Located near the Mountain Province-Benguet border. |
| Mount Deugurug | | 1,010 m (3,310 ft) | | Nueva Ecija | | 16°00′00″N 121°07′00″E | |
| Didicas Volcano | | 228 m (748 ft) | | Cagayan | | 19°4.6′N 122°12.1′E | |
| Mount Diffun | | | | Quirino | | | |
| Mount Diogo | | 547 m (1,795 ft) | | Batanes | | 20°43′30″N 121°55′30″E | Inactive volcano |
| Mount Dit | | 231 m (758 ft) | | Palawan | | 11°15′00″N 120°56′00″E | Inactive volcano |
| Dome Peak (Mount Dome) | | 1,670 m (5,480 ft) | | Zambales | Zambales Mountains | 15°20′06″N 120°10′36″E | |
| Dome Peak | | 858 m (2,815 ft) | | Negros Oriental | | 9°12′36″N 122°59′45″E | |
| Mount Dome | | 1,063 m (3,488 ft) | | Ifugao | Cordillera Central | 16°51′43″N 121°13′25″E | |
| Mount Dorst | | 866 m (2,841 ft) | | Pampanga | | 15°08′07″N 120°25′58″E | |
| Mount Dos Hermanas | | 813 m (2,667 ft) | | South Cotabato | | 7°38′27″N 124°07′45″E | Inactive volcano |
| Mount Dos Hermanos | | 1,614 m (5,295 ft) | | Isabela/ Nueva Vizcaya | Sierra Madre | 16°31′46″N 122°04′42″E | |
| Dos Picos Mountain | | 595 m (1,952 ft) | | Cavite | | 14°12′25″N 120°39′48″E | |
| Mount Dulang‑dulang | | 2,938 m (9,639 ft) | 2,444 m (8,018 ft) | Bukidnon | Kitanglad Range | 08°06′55″N 124°55′15″E | Highest point in Bukidnon and Northern Mindanao. |
| Mount Dumali | | 756 m (2,480 ft) | | Mindoro Oriental | | 13°06′16″N 121°30′45″E | Inactive volcano |
| Mount Dumapata | | | | Quirino | | 16°20′46″N 121°46′38″E | |
| Mount Dupungan | | 396 m (1,299 ft) | | Zamboanga del Sur | | 7°38′00″N 123°19′30″E | Inactive volcano |
| Mount Elizario | | 508 m (1,667 ft) | | Camarines Sur | | | |
| Mount Engañaso (Enganosa) | | 428 m (1,404 ft) | | Masbate | | 12°52′08″N 123°13′35″E | |
| Mount Esbo | | | | Benguet | Cordillera Central | | |
| Flat Peak | | 1,452 m (4,764 ft) | | Cagayan | Sierra Madre | 17°43′00″N 122°06′00″E | |
| Mount Gadungan | | 1,342 m (4,403 ft) | | Lanao | | 7°46′42″N 124°04′42″E | Inactive volcano |
| Mount Galantay | | 1,274 m (4,180 ft) | | Lanao | | 7°53′00″N 124°00′00″E | Inactive volcano |
| Mount Gantung | | 1,784 m (5,853 ft) | | Palawan | | 8°57′37″N 117°49′03″E | |
| Mount Gap | | 1,038 m (3,406 ft) | | Cotabato | | 6°52′00″N 125°08′00″E | Inactive volcano |
| Mount Gatas (Gata) | | | | Zambales, Tarlac | Zambales Mountains | 15°15′38″N 120°19′15″E | |
| Gate Mountains | | 559 m (1,834 ft) | | Sorsogon | | 12°36′00″N 124°02′00″E | Inactive volcano |
| Mount Gayad | | 618 m (2,028 ft) | | Leyte | | 11°26′00″N 124°31′00″E | Inactive volcano |
| Mount Gedgedayan | | | | Benguet | Cordillera Central | | |
| Mount Giligaon | | | | Negros Oriental | | 9°07′51″N 122°57′45″E | |
| Mount Ginsiliban | | 581 m (1,906 ft) | | Camiguin | | 9°06′00″N 124°46′00″E | Inactive volcano |
| Mount Guiauasan | | 1,600 m (5,200 ft) | | Biliran | | 11°37′00″N 124°29′00″E | Inactive volcano |
| Mount Guinsayawan (Tipasi, Tepasi) | | 1,821 m (5,974 ft) | | Negros Oriental | | | |
| Mount Guimba | | 482 m (1,581 ft) | | Sulu | | 6°01′30″N 121°05′00″E | Inactive volcano |
| Mount Guiting-Guiting (Guitinguitin) | | 2,051 m (6,729 ft), 2,058 m | | Romblon | | 12°25′00″N 122°34′09″E | |
| Mount Gunansan | | 1,045 m (3,428 ft) | | Biliran | | 11°36′00″N 124°29′00″E | Inactive volcano |
| Mount Gurain | | 1,825 m (5,988 ft) | | Lanao | | 7°54′30″N 124°06′30″E | Inactive volcano |
| Hagdanan Peak | | | | Occidental Mindoro | | 12°25′00″N 121°10′00″E | |
| Mount Halcon | | 2,582 m (8,471 ft), 2,555 m, 2,505 m, 2,586 m | 2,582 m (8,471 ft) | Oriental Mindoro | | 13°15′25″N 120°59′37″E | Highest mountain in Mindoro Island and MIMAROPA. |
| Mount Hamiguitan (Hamiquitan) | | 1,633 m (5,358 ft), 1,620 m, 1,629 m | 1,497 m (4,911 ft) | Davao Oriental | | 6°44′24″N 126°10′54″E | |
| Mount Hibok‑Hibok (Hibok‑Hibok Volcano) | ‡ | 1,332 m (4,370 ft) | 1,332 m (4,370 ft) | Camiguin | | 9°12′15″N 124°40′13″E | stratovolcano and dome complex (active; last erupted 1948 Sept. 31 – 1953 July). Highest in the island. |
| Mount Hilonghilong | | 1,838 m (6,030 ft) | | Agusan del Norte | | | |
| Mount Homahan | | 464 m (1,522 ft) | | Sorsogon | | 12°46′30″N 123°58′30″E | Inactive volcano |
| Mount Iba | | 1,670 m (5,480 ft), 1,605 m | | Zambales, Tarlac | Zambales Mountains | 15°21′50″N 120°10′09″E | Located near the Zambales-Tarlac border. |
| Mount Iglit | | | | Occidental Mindoro | | | |
| Mount Imbing | | 699 m (2,293 ft), 701 m | | Zamboanga del Sur | | 7°41′13″N 123°14′10″E | Inactive volcano |
| Imoc Hill | | 400 m (1,300 ft) | | Laguna | | 14°07′00″N 121°18′00″E | Inactive volcano |
| Mount Inayawan | | 1,174 m (3,852 ft) | | Lanao del Norte | | 7°49′30″N 124°58′00″E | Inactive volcano |
| Mount Iniaoan | | 1,535 m (5,036 ft) | | Lanao del Norte | | 7°49′00″N 124°55′30″E | Inactive volcano |
| Mount Irada (Iraya) | † | 1,008 m (3,307 ft), 1009 m | | Batanes | | 20°28′05″N 122°00′40″E | stratovolcano (active; last erupted 1454); Highest in Batan Island. |
| Mount Irid | | 1,448 m (4,751 ft) | | Rizal | | 14°48′43″N 121°20′15″E | |
| Mount Iriga | ‡ | 1,196 m (3,924 ft), 1,143 m | | Camarines Sur | Bicol Volcanic Belt | 13°27′30″N 123°27′03″E | stratovolcano (active; last erupted 1642 Jan. 4) |
| Mount Isarog | † | 1,976 m (6,483 ft), 1,966 m | 1,951 m (6,401 ft) | Camarines Sur | Bicol Volcanic Belt | 13°39′30″N 123°22′23″E | Potentially active stratovolcano |
| Mount Jamalapan | | 1,446 m (4,744 ft) | | Ifugao | Cordillera Central | | |
| Mount Janagdan | | 1,200 m (3,900 ft) | | Leyte | | 11°06′00″N 124°43′00″E | Inactive volcano |
| Mount Jormajan | | 738 m (2,421 ft), 670 m | | Sorsogon | | 12°45′29″N 124°00′06″E | Inactive volcano |
| Mount Juban (Juban Volcano) | | 844 m (2,769 ft), 730 m | | Sorsogon | | 12°47′51″N 123°56′02″E | Inactive volcano |
| Mount Kaatoan | | 2,153 m (7,064 ft) | | Bukidnon | | 8°08′00″N 124°55′00″E | Inactive volcano |
| Mount Kabanangan | | 340 m (1,120 ft) | | Lanao | | 7°56′30″N 123°49′30″E | Inactive volcano |
| Mount Kabaritan | | 1,157 m (3,796 ft) | | Bukidnon | | 7°52′00″N 124°40′00″E | Inactive volcano |
| Mount Kabunian | | | | Benguet | Cordillera Central | | |
| Mount Kalatungan | † | 2,824 m (9,265 ft), 2,187 m | 1,502 m (4,928 ft) | Bukidnon | Kalatungan Mountain Range | 7°57′N 124°48′E | Potentially active volcano |
| Mount Kalugong | | | | Benguet | Cordillera Central | 16°27′38″N 120°35′38″E | |
| Mount Kamaltakan | | | | Benguet | Cordillera Central | | |
| Mount Kampalili | | 2,257 m (7,405 ft), 2,309 m | | Davao | | 7°18′20″N 126°17′09″E | (*The mountain is listed in Peakery.com as being under Camarines Sur) |
| Kanlaon Volcano (Mount Canlaon) | ‡ | 2,465 m (8,087 ft), 2435 m, 2,430 m | 2,430 m (7,970 ft) | Negros Oriental, Negros Occidental | | 10°24′42″N 123°07′57″E | stratovolcano (active; last erupted 2006 June). Highest mountain in Negros Island and Visayas. |
| Mount Kanumay | | 981 m (3,219 ft) | | Rizal | | 14°38′42″N 121°18′55″E | |
| Mount Kapiligan | | 2,709 m (8,888 ft) | 676 m (2,218 ft) | Ifugao | Cordillera Central | 16°50′45″N 120°56′28″E | |
| Mount Kasibor | | 845 m (2,772 ft) | | Leyte | | 10°52′00″N 124°53′00″E | Inactive volcano |
| Mount Kitanglad | | 2,899 m (9,511 ft) | 350 m (1,150 ft) | Bukidnon | Kitanglad Range | 8°07′42″N 124°55′30″E | Inactive volcano.. |
| Mount Kausakar | | 200 m (660 ft) | | Sulu | | 5°55′30″N 121°22′00″E | Inactive volcano |
| Mount Kaman‑eleng | | | | Benguet | Cordillera Central | | |
| Mount Kidongin | | 1,143 m (3,750 ft) | | Bukidnon | | 7°45′30″N 124°49′00″E | Inactive volcano |
| Mount Kilakron | | 2,329 m (7,641 ft), 2,360 m | | South Cotabato | | 7°57′30″N 124°52′31″E | Inactive volcano |
| Mount Kilkili | | | | Benguet | Cordillera Central | | |
| Mount Kinabalian | | | | Agusan del Sur | | 8°12′30″N 125°26′04″E | |
| Kioto Mountains | | 1,816 m (5,958 ft) | 1,639 m (5,377 ft) | Davao Occidental | | 6°06′21″N 125°37′41″E | |
| Mount Kirikite | | 202 m (663 ft) | | Leyte | | 11°57′00″N 124°22′00″E | Inactive volcano |
| Mount Kitabud | | 1,167 m (3,829 ft) | | Lanao del Sur | | 7°17′06″N 124°39′43″E | Inactive volcano |
| Mount Kitongan | | | | Benguet | Cordillera Central | | |
| Knob Peak | | 917 m (3,009 ft) | | Oriental Mindoro | | 12°28′00″N 121°16′00″E | Inactive volcano |
| Mount Koloko | | 1,074 m (3,524 ft) | | Bukidnon | | 7°50′24″N 124°55′42″E | Inactive volcano |
| Mount Kotkot | | 1,620 m (5,310 ft) | | Benguet | Cordillera Central | 16°26′57″N 120°47′16″E | |
| Mount Kumakata | | | | Agusan del Sur | | 8°07′42″N 125°35′43″E | |
| Mount Laao | | 1,135 m (3,724 ft) | | Leyte | | 11°07′00″N 124°48′00″E | Inactive volcano |
| Mount Labalasan (Osmeña Peak) | | 1,013 m (3,323 ft) | | Cebu | | | Highest in Cebu Island. |
| Mount Labi | | 1,300 m (4,300 ft) | | Leyte | | 11°01′00″N 124°31′00″E | Inactive volcano |
| Mount Labo | † | 1,544 m (5,066 ft), 942 m | 1,524 m (5,000 ft) | Camarines Norte | Bicol Volcanic Belt | 14°00′49″N 122°47′14″E | Potentially active compound volcano |
| Mount Lagula | | 482 m (1,581 ft) | | Laguna | | 14°08′00″N 121°19′00″E | Inactive volcano |
| Laguna Caldera | | 743 m (2,438 ft) | | Laguna | | 14.45824°N 121.34624°E | |
| Mount Lamagan | | 2,138 m (7,014 ft) | | Mountain Province | Cordillera Central | 17°06′44″N 121°07′56″E | |
| Mount Lambayo | | 1,386 m (4,547 ft) | | Apayao | Cordillera Central | 18°12′49″N 121°09′25″E | |
| Mount Lanat | | 1,044 m (3,425 ft) | | Zambales | Zambales Mountains | 15°38′52″N 120°02′23″E | |
| Mount Landargun | | 1,655 m (5,430 ft) | | Palawan | | 8°54′47″N 117°47′05″E | |
| Lantawan Peak (Bugtong‑Bato) | | 1,049 m (3,442 ft) | | Negros Occidental | | 10°50′02″N 123°14′09″E | |
| Mount Lantoy | | 593 m (1,946 ft) | | Cebu | | 9°59′00″N 123°33′11″E | |
| Mount Lapak (Lapac) | | 357 m (1,171 ft) | | Sulu | | 5°31′01″N 120°45′36″E | |
| Mount Latian | | 1,612 m (5,289 ft) | | Davao Occidental (Davao del Sur) | | 6°12′33″N 125°30′27″E | |
| Latukan Volcano | | 2,338 m (7,671 ft), 2,327 m, 2,316 m | | Lanao del Sur | | 7°39′N 124°27′E | Inactive stratovolcano |
| Mount Lauaan | | 1,177 m (3,862 ft), 1,187 m | | Biliran/Leyte | | 11°31′00″N 124°31′00″E | Inactive volcano |
| Leonard Kniaseff (Leonard Kniazeff) | | 200 m (660 ft) | | Davao del Norte | | 7°22′54″N 126°2′48″E | stratovolcano |
| Mount Libadan | | 825 m (2,707 ft) | | Cotabato | | 6°53′00″N 125°06′30″E | Inactive volcano |
| Mount Libo-Libo | | 1,771 m (5,810 ft) | | Ilocos Sur | Cordillera Central | 16°53′59″N 120°37′28″E | (May refer to "Mount Liblibo" in Benguet near the Ilocos Sur border). |
| Mount Licod-ti-Duyog | | 2,024 m (6,640 ft) | | Apayao | Cordillera Central | | |
| Mount Liguayen | | 968 m (3,176 ft) | | Batangas | | 13°42′00″N 121°11′00″E | Inactive volcano |
| Mount Limay (Cayapo) | | 946 m (3,104 ft) | | Bataan | | 14°32′13″N 120°31′56″E | |
| Mount Linao | | 1,475 m (4,839 ft) | | Ilocos Norte | Cordillera Central | 18°21′18″N 120°54′39″E | |
| Lipa Pt. | | 220 m (720 ft) | | Batangas | | 14°01′00″N 121°04′00″E | Inactive volcano |
| Mount Llorente | | 1,344 m (4,409 ft) | | Iloilo | | 10°58′00″N 122°19′00″E | |
| Mount Lobi | | 1,000 m (3,300 ft), 1,349 m | | Leyte | | 11°00′43″N 124°48′44″E | Inactive volcano |
| Mount Lobo | | 2,156 m (7,073 ft); 2,138m | | Benguet, | Cordillera Central | 16°46′10″N 120°41′03″E | |
| Mount Lobo | | 972 m (3,189 ft), 946 m | | Batangas | | 13°38′57″N 121°17′28″E | Inactive volcano |
| Mount Loco‑ono | | 2,316 m (7,598 ft) | | Mountain Province | Cordillera Central | 17°10′37″N 120°52′17″E | |
| Mount Lugus | | 297 m (974 ft) | | Sulu | | 5°41′00″N 120°50′00″E | Inactive volcano |
| Mount Lumot | | 579 m (1,900 ft) | | Bulacan | | 15°03′49″N 121°06′22″E | |
| Mount Lumot | | | | Misamis Oriental | | | |
| Mount Lumuluyaw | | 2,612 m (8,570 ft) | 170 m (560 ft) | Bukidnon | Kitanglad Range | 8°06′28″N 124°56′19″E | |
| Mount Luntan | | 472 m (1,549 ft) | | Quezon | Sierra Madre | 14°16′28″N 121°41′53″E | |
| Mount Luyong | | 318 m (1,043 ft) | | Laguna | | 14°07′00″N 121°15′00″E | Inactive volcano |
| Mount Maagnaw | | 2,742 m (8,996 ft) | 331 m (1,086 ft) | Bukidnon | Kitanglad Range | 8°07′21″N 124°52′37″E | |
| Mount Maagonoc | | 680 m (2,230 ft) | | Leyte | | 11°01′30″N 124°41′30″E | Inactive volcano |
| Mount Mabaho | | 1,860 m (6,100 ft), 1,584 m | | Agusan del Norte | | 9°18′07″N 125°40′47″E | |
| Mount Mabilog | | 200 m (660 ft) | | Laguna | | 14°06′30″N 121°15′00″E | Inactive volcano |
| Mount Mabitoan | | 1,230 m (4,040 ft) | | Bulacan | | 14°54′59″N 121°18′01″E | |
| Mount Mabittayon | | 660 m (2,170 ft) | | Ifugao | Cordillera Central | 16°45′00″N 121°17′00″E | |
| Mount Mabolinoc | | 830 m (2,720 ft) | | Zambales | Zambales Mountains | 14°56′59″N 120°17′04″E | |
| Mount Mabudis | | 234 m (768 ft) | | Batanes | | 20°56′00″N 121°55′00″E | Inactive volcano |
| Mount Macape | | 315 m (1,033 ft) | | Leyte | | 11°13′00″N 124°41′00″E | Inactive volcano |
| Mount Macatohuol | | 1,369 m (4,491 ft) | | Bulacan | | 14°52′44″N 121°19′12″E | |
| Mount Macopa | | 1,602 m (5,256 ft) or 1,595 m | | Apayao, Abra | Cordillera Central | 17°44′23″N 121°07′03″E | Located near the Apayao-Abra border. |
| Mount Macolod (Maculot) | | 956 m (3,136 ft), 947 m | | Batangas | | 13°55′15″N 121°03′06″E | Inactive volcano |
| Mount Madia‑as (Madja‑as, Madya‑as) | | 2,117 m (6,946 ft), 2,080 m | 2,117 m (6,946 ft) | Antique | Central Panay Mountain Range | 11°23′02″N 122°09′40″E | Highest in Panay Island. |
| Mount Madocay | | 1,443 m (4,734 ft) | | Abra | Cordillera Central | 17°35′27″N 121°01′01″E | |
| Mount Maestre de Campo | | 343 m (1,125 ft) | | Romblon | | 12°55′00″N 121°42′00″E | Inactive volcano |
| Mount Magampao | | 1,468 m (4,816 ft) | | Cotabato | | 7°37′06″N 124°35′53″E | Inactive volcano |
| Magkurog Peak (Danlog) | | 1,604 m (5,262 ft) | | Negros Occidental | | | |
| Mahagnao Volcano | | 860 m (2,820 ft) | | Leyte | | 10°53′45″N 124°52′00″E | Inactive stratovolcano |
| Mount Mahala | | 286 m (938 ft) | | Sulu | | 5°56′00″N 121°07′00″E | Inactive volcano |
| Mount Makam | | 427 m (1,401 ft) | | Sulu | | 5°56′24″N 120°58′24″E | Inactive volcano |
| Makawiwili Peak | | 2,141 m (7,024 ft) | | Negros Occidental | | | Secondary peak of Mount Kanlaon |
| Mount Makaturing | ‡ | 1,908 m (6,260 ft), 1,940 m | | Lanao del Sur | | 7°39′N 124°19′E | stratovolcano (active; last erupted on March 18, 1882) |
| Mount Makiling (Maquiling) | | 1,090 m (3,580 ft), 1,109 m | | Laguna | | 14°08′05″N 121°11′44″E | Inactive volcano |
| Mount Malabahog | | 628 m (2,060 ft) | | Siquijor | | | |
| Mount Malabito | | 1,360 m (4,460 ft) | | Quezon, Laguna | Sierra Madre | 14°41′07″N 121°26′12″E | |
| Mount Malabobo | | 329 m (1,079 ft) | | Pangasinan | | 15°43′00″N 120°18′00″E | Inactive volcano |
| Mount Malabsing | | 510 m (1,670 ft) | | Cagayan | | 18°51′30″N 121°53′00″E | Inactive volcano |
| Mount Malambo | | 900 m (3,000 ft) | | Cotabato | | 7°39′12″N 125°18′42″E | Inactive volcano |
| Mount Malapantao | | 619 m (2,031 ft) | | Negros Occidental | | 9°53′50″N 122°36′58″E | |
| Mount Malarayat | | 1,004 m (3,294 ft) | | Batangas | | | |
| Mount Malasimbo | | 800 m (2,600 ft) | | Mindoro Oriental | | 13°27′12″N 120°54′01″E | |
| Mount Malauban - Lansay | | 319 m (1,047 ft) | | Laguna | | 14°08′00″N 121°24′00″E | Inactive volcano |
| Mount Namidraan | | 2,334 m (7,657 ft) | 800 m (2,600 ft) | Ilocos Sur | Cordillera Central | 16°55′02″N 120°41′29″E | |
| Mount Malbug | | 840 m (2,760 ft) | | Negros Oriental | | | |
| Mount Malepunyo | | 963 m (3,159 ft) | | Batangas, Laguna, Quezon | | 13°57′00″N 121°14′00″E | Inactive volcano |
| Mount Malibao | | 1,500 m (4,900 ft) | | South Cotabato | | 6°11′30″N 124°54′00″E | Inactive volcano |
| Mount Malinao | † | 1,548 m (5,079 ft), 1,657 m | | Albay | Bicol Volcanic Belt | 13°24′39″N 123°37′38″E | Potentially active strato-cone volcano |
| Mount Malindang | | 2,425 m (7,956 ft), 2,404 m | 2,290 m (7,510 ft) | Misamis Occidental | | 8°13′06″N 123°38′05″E | Inactive stratovolcano. Highest in Misamis Occidental. |
| Mount Malindig | † | 1,157 m (3,796 ft), 871 m, 965 m | | Marinduque | | 13°15′N 122°00′E | Potentially active stratovolcano Highest in Marinduque Island. Also known as "Marlanga". |
| Mount Maliwatan | | 1,200 m (3,900 ft) | | Biliran | | 11°39′N 124°27′E | Inactive volcano |
| Mount Mambajao | | 1,524 m (5,000 ft) | | Camiguin | | 9°10′18″N 124°43′18″E | Inactive volcano |
| Mount Mamot | | 1,002 m (3,287 ft) | | Cotabato | | 7°58′00″N 124°08′00″E | Inactive volcano |
| Mount Manago | | 1,595 m (5,233 ft) | | Abra | Cordillera Central | 17°44′44″N 120°57′37″E | |
| Mount Mandalagan | † | 1,885 m (6,184 ft), 1,879 m, 1,880 m | | Negros Occidental | | 10°38′12″N 123°14′09″E | Potentially active stratovolcano |
| Mount Mangaban | | 780 m (2,560 ft) | | Misamis Oriental | | 8°30′30″N 125°00′30″E | Inactive volcano |
| Mount Mangabon | | 2,480 m (8,140 ft), 2 510 m | 1,803 m (5,915 ft) | Misamis Oriental | | 8°36′19″N 125°06′31″E | |
| Mount Mangatarem | | 644 m (2,113 ft) | | Pangasinan | | 15°53′26″N 120°06′14″E | |
| Mount Mangpolo | | 848 m (2,782 ft) | | Nueva Ecija | | 15°53′00″N 121°03′00″E | |
| Mount Manmanoc | | 2,024 m (6,640 ft); 2,029 m | | Abra | Cordillera Central | 17°39′48″N 121°05′32″E | |
| Mani Hill | | 260 m (850 ft) | | Laguna | | 14°02′00″N 121°15′30″E | Inactive volcano |
| Mount Mantalingajan (Mantaling) | | 2,085 m (6,841 ft) | 2,085 m (6,841 ft) | Palawan | | 13°55′N 121°03′E | Highest in Palawan Island. |
| Mount Manunggal | | 884 m (2,900 ft) | | Cebu | | | |
| Mapait Hills | | 380 m (1,250 ft) | | Laguna | | 14°03′00″N 121°14′30″E | Inactive volcano |
| Mount Mapula | | 209 m (686 ft) | | Laguna | | 14°06′00″N 121°17′00″E | Inactive volcano |
| Mount Marahem | | 453 m (1,486 ft) | | Batanes | | | |
| Mount Marami | | | | Batangas | | 14°11′55″N 120°41′10″E | |
| Mount Maranat | | 1,858 m (6,096 ft) | | Lanao, Bukidnon | | 7°46′18″N 124°33′42″E | Inactive volcano |
| Mount Margosa Tubig | | 411 m (1,348 ft) | | Zamboanga del Sur | | 7°33′00″N 123°11′00″E | Inactive volcano |
| Mount Marikit | | | | Benguet | Cordillera Central | | |
| Maripipi Volcano | † | 924 m (3,031 ft) | | Leyte | | 11°48′00″N 124°20′00″E | Potentially active volcano |
| Mount Mariveles (Mariveles Mountain) | † | 1,388 m (4,554 ft) | | Bataan | | 14°32′47″N 120°28′56″E | Potentially active stratovolcano |
| Mount Mariyug | | 1,490 m (4,890 ft) | | South Cotabato | | 7°34′36″N 124°35′30″E | Inactive volcano |
| Mount Masadsadac | | 801 m (2,628 ft) | | Ilocos Norte | | 18°16′30″N 120°45′58″E | |
| Mount Masapao | | 448 m (1,470 ft) | | Batangas | | | |
| Mount Masaraga | | 1,337 m (4,386 ft), 1,328 m | | Albay | Bicol Volcanic Belt | 13°18′45″N 123°35′56″E | Inactive stratovolcano |
| Mount Mataas na Gulod | | 641 m (2,103 ft) | | Cavite | | 14°12′19″N 120°41′12″E | |
| Mount Matanal | | 611 m (2,005 ft) | | Basilan | | 6°32′00″N 122°18′00″E | Inactive volcano |
| Mount Matanding | | 400 m (1,300 ft) | | Sulu | | 6°02′00″N 121°04′00″E | Inactive volcano |
| Mount Matarem (Mafarem) | | 459 m (1,506 ft) | | Batanes | | 20°23′00″N 121°56′00″E | Inactive volcano |
| Mount Matutum (Matutum Volcano) | ‡ | 2,286 m (7,500 ft), 2,293 m | 1,950 m (6,400 ft) | South Cotabato | | 6°21′36″N 125°04′33″E | stratovolcano (active; last erupted on March 7, 1911) |
| Mount Maubanban | | 1,035 m (3,396 ft) | | Zambales | Zambales Mountains | 14°53′49″N 120°06′23″E | |
| Mount Mayabobo | | 300 m (980 ft) (approx) | | Quezon | | 13°59′N 121°27′E | |
| Mount Mayo | | 1,738 m (5,702 ft) | | Davao Oriental | | 7°05′58″N 126°18′42″E | |
| Mayon Volcano | ‡ | 2,460 m (8,070 ft), 2,462 m, 2,421 m, 2,417 m | 2,447 m (8,028 ft) | Albay | Bicol Volcanic Belt | 13°15′17″N 123°41′06″E | stratovolcano (active; last erupted in 2014) |
| Mount Mengmeng (Menmeng) | | 2,263 m (7,425 ft) | | Mountain Province, Abra | Cordillera Central | 17°13′05″N 120°54′35″E | Located near the Abra-Mountain Province border. |
| Mount Merill | | 1,405 m (4,610 ft) | | Mindoro Oriental, Mindoro Occidental | | | |
| Mount Micbacan | | 500 m (1,600 ft) | | Lanao | | 7°43′30″N 123°54′00″E | Inactive volcano |
| Mingan Mountains | | 1,901 m (6,237 ft) | 1,601 m (5,253 ft) | Aurora | Sierra Madre | 15°25′27″N 121°24′25″E | |
| Mount Mirador | | 366 m (1,201 ft) | | Quezon | | 16°25′N 120°35′E | |
| Mount Moises | | 1,240 m (4,070 ft) | | Isabela | Sierra Madre | 17°12′50″N 122°07′17″E | |
| Mount Mongoto | | 2,719 m (8,921 ft) | 964 m (3,163 ft) | Benguet | Cordillera Central | 16°39′16″N 120°47′12″E | |
| Mount Monserrat | | 1,763 m (5,784 ft) | | Ilocos Sur | Cordillera Central | 17°02′49″N 120°38′07″E | |
| Mount Muji | | 1,153 m (3,783 ft) | | Apayao, Abra | Cordillera Central | 17°50′57″N 121°04′44″E | Located near the Apayao-Abra border. |
| Mount Muskut | | 2,223 m (7,293 ft) | | Kalinga | Cordillera Central | 17°27′24″N 121°07′54″E | |
| Musuan Peak | | 646 m (2,119 ft) | | Bukidnon | | 7°52′36″N 125°4′6″E | Volcano (dome, tuff cone); active (last erupted in 1867) |
| Mount Nagcarlan (Nagcarlang) | | 629 m (2,064 ft) | | Laguna | | 14°08′48″N 121°20′41″E | Inactive volcano |
| Mount Nagdubaduban (Nagdabbaduban) | | 1,786 m (5,860 ft), 1,876 m | | Ilocos Norte | Cordillera Central | 18°15′36″N 120°55′17″E | |
| Mount Nailog | | 789 m (2,589 ft) | | Romblon | | 12°27′N 122°31′E | |
| Mount Naltoot | | 1,036 m (3,399 ft) | | Ilocos Norte | Cordillera Central | 17°50′37″N 120°36′27″E | |
| Mount Nalisbitan | | 329 m (1,079 ft) | | Camarines Norte | | 14°05′00″N 122°36′00″E | Inactive volcano |
| Mount Naminudot | | 1,219 m (3,999 ft) | | Nueva Vizcaya | | | |
| Mount Nangaoto | | 2,553 m (8,376 ft) | 178 m (584 ft) | Benguet | Cordillera Central | 16°40′48″N 120°46′57″E | |
| Mount Nangtud (Nangtod) | | 2,049 m | | Capiz, Antique | | 11°16′03″N 122°12′29″E | . |
| Mount Napulac (Napulak) | | 366 m (1,201 ft) | | Iloilo | | 10°48′27″N 122°13′06″E | |
| Mount Napulauan | | 2,611 m (8,566 ft) | 284 m (932 ft) | Ifugao | Cordillera Central | 16°49′51″N 120°57′38″E | |
| Mount Nara | | 1,539 m (5,049 ft) | | Davao del Sur | | 5°53′07″N 125°32′44″E | |
| Mount Narvacan | | | | Ilocos Sur | | 17°26′00″N 120°27′00″E | |
| Mount Natib | † | 1,253 m (4,111 ft) | | Bataan | | 14°42′43″N 120°23′59″E | Potentially active stratovolcano |
| Mount Nato‑o | | | | Benguet | Cordillera Central | | |
| Mount Naujan | | 490 m (1,610 ft) | | Mindoro Oriental | | 13°12′24″N 121°25′00″E | Inactive volcano |
| Mount Nausang | | 1,650 m (5,410 ft) | | Aklan | | 11°22′09″N 122°12′52″E | |
| Mount Navaro | | 1,122 m (3,681 ft) | | Cotabato | | 6°23′30″N 125°01′00″E | Inactive volcano |
| Mount Navitas | | 616 m (2,021 ft) | | Romblon | | 12°29′31″N 122°02′26″E | Highest in Tablas Island. |
| Mount Negron | † | 1,583 m (5,194 ft), 1,580 m, 1,590 m | | Pampanga, Zambales | Zambales Mountains | 15°05′34″N 120°22′05″E | Potentially active volcano. Located near the Pampanga-Zambales border. |
| Mount Nelangcapan | | 687 m (2,254 ft) | | Southern Leyte | | 9°56′00″N 125°15′30″E | Inactive volcano |
| Mount Nonan | | 1,547 m (5,075 ft) | | Abra | Cordillera Central | 17°29′53″N 120°56′12″E | |
| North Peak Bulagao | | 1,120 m (3,670 ft) | | Abra | Cordillera Central | 17°39′N 120°30′E | |
| Mount Obulan | | 1,245 m (4,085 ft) | | Misamis Oriental | | 8°48′00″N 124°51′30″E | Inactive volcano |
| Mount Olilia | | 376 m (1,234 ft) | | Laguna | | 14°05′00″N 121°13′00″E | Inactive volcano |
| Mount Olong Amo (Olo Olo ng Amoi) | | 1,164 m (3,819 ft) | | Nueva Ecija | | 15°57′38″N 121°09′23″E | |
| Mount Opow | | 553 m (1,814 ft) | | Leyte | | 11°25′00″N 124°18′00″E | Inactive volcano |
| Mount Orcog | | | | Nueva Vizcaya | | 16°29′00″N 121°00′00″E | |
| Mount Oriod | | 1,193 m (3,914 ft) | | Bulacan | | 14°52′12″N 121°13′18″E | Highest in Bulacan province (misspelled as "Driod" in given source). |
| Mount Osdung (Osdong) | | 2,615 m (8,579 ft), 2,617 m | 374 m (1,227 ft) | Benguet | Cordillera Central | 16°43′00″N 120°46′00″E | |
| Mount Osmena | | 380 m (1,250 ft) | | Leyte | | 11°25′00″N 124°32′00″E | Inactive volcano |
| Mount Oten | | | | Benguet | Cordillera Central | | |
| Mount Oyayao | | 1,898 m (6,227 ft) | | Mountain Province | Cordillera Central | 17°07′23″N 121°15′05″E | |
| Mount Pack | | 2,294 m (7,526 ft), 2,289 m | | Nueva Vizcaya | | 16°27′36″N 120°53′29″E | |
| Paco Volcano | | 524 m (1,719 ft) | | Surigao del Norte | | 9°35′36″N 125°31′06″E | Inactive volcano |
| Mount Pagalongan | | | | Bukidnon | | 8°17′00″N 125°09′00″E | |
| Mount Pagyasngan | | 783 m (2,569 ft) | | Sulu | | 6°32′00″N 125°20′48″E | Inactive volcano |
| Mount Palali | | 1,682 m (5,518 ft) | | Nueva Vizcaya | | 16°25′42″N 121°13′25″E | |
| Mount Palanan | | 1,212 m (3,976 ft) | | Isabela | Sierra Madre | 17°03′43″N 122°16′30″E | |
| Mount Palansa | | 2,001 m (6,565 ft), 2,060 m | | Benguet/ Mountain Province | Cordillera Central | 16°33′00″N 120°52′00″E | |
| Mount Palay-palay | | 648 m (2,126 ft) | | Cavite | | 14°15′N 120°39′E | Inactive volcano |
| Palindan Hill | | 260 m (850 ft) | | Laguna | | 14°02′00″N 121°15′30″E | Inactive volcano |
| Mount Palugloko | | 2,356 m (7,730 ft) | 12 m (39 ft) | Ifugao | Cordillera Central | 16°47′00″N 120°53′00″E | |
| Mount Pamalihi | | 1,956 m (6,417 ft) | | Misamis Oriental | | 8°50′N 124°55′E | Inactive volcano |
| Mount Pamucuban | | 793 m (2,602 ft) | | Occidental Mindoro | | 13°11′45″N 120°50′17″E | |
| Mount Pan de Azucar (Manaphag, Taas‑Bukid) | | 571 m (1,873 ft) | | Iloilo | | 11°17′00″N 123°10′00″E | Inactive volcano |
| Mount Pana | | 336 m (1,102 ft) | | Lanao | | 7°54′30″N 123°54′30″E | Inactive volcano |
| Mount Panamao | | 1,056 m (3,465 ft) | | Biliran Island | | 11°40′00″N 124°24′00″E | Inactive volcano |
| Mount Panamao | | 399 m (1,309 ft) | | Sulu | | 5°58′00″N 121°10′00″E | Inactive volcano |
| Mount Panay | | 501 m (1,644 ft) | | Batangas | | 13°43′00″N 120°54′00″E | Inactive stratovolcano |
| Mount Pangasahan | | 217 m (712 ft) | | Basilan | | 6°36′30″N 121°50′00″E | Inactive volcano |
| Mount Pangasugan | | 1,150 m (3,770 ft) | | Leyte | | | |
| Mount Pangasun | | 843 m (2,766 ft) | | Cagayan | | 19°32′00″N 121°57′00″E | Inactive volcano. Located in Calayan Island. |
| Mount Pantadon | | | | Agusan del Sur | | 8°01′00″N 125°20′00″E | |
| Mount Pantao | | 400 m (1,300 ft) | | Albay | | 13°10′00″N 123°21′00″E | |
| Mount Pao | | 1,200 m (3,900 ft) | | Ilocos Norte | Cordillera Central | 18°24′54″N 120°52′25″E | |
| Mount Paquis | | 2,140 m (7,020 ft) | | Mountain Province | Cordillera Central | | |
| Mount Parker (Parker Volcano) | ‡ | 1,784 m (5,853 ft), 1,824 m, 1,738 m | | South Cotabato | | 6°06′48″N 124°53′30″E | stratovolcano (active; last erupted on 1641 Jan. 4) |
| Mount Pata | | 394 m (1,293 ft) | | Sulu | | 5°49′00″N 121°09′30″E | Inactive volcano |
| Mount Patoc | | 1,850 m (6,070 ft), 1,865 m | | Mountain Province | Cordillera Central | 17°08′47″N 120°58′56″E | stratovolcano |
| Mount Patrick | | | | Occidental Mindoro | | 12°58′38″N 121°05′11″E | |
| Mount Pawac | | | | Nueva Vizcaya | | 16°31′00″N 121°06′00″E | |
| Mount Pawoi | | 2,456 m (8,058 ft), 2,260 m | 165 m (541 ft) | Benguet/ Mountain Province | Cordillera Central | 16°38′00″N 120°45′00″E | |
| Peak 1 | | 1,661 m (5,449 ft) | | Nueva Ecija | | | |
| Peak 2 | | 1,812 m (5,945 ft) | | Nueva Ecija | | | |
| Mount Pico de Loro | | 880 m (2,890 ft) | | Batangas, Cavite | | 14°12′51″N 120°38′47″E | Located near the Batangas-Cavite border. |
| Mount Pico de Loro | | 1,350 m (4,430 ft) | | Ilocos Norte | Cordillera Central | 18°30′50″N 120°53′13″E | |
| Mount Pinamucan | | 798 m (2,618 ft), 681 m | | Batangas | | 13°39′12″N 121°06′19″E | Inactive volcano |
| Mount Pinatubo (Pinatubo Volcano) | | 1,445 m (4,741 ft), 1,486 m | | Zambales | Zambales Mountains | 15°08′40″N 120°21′04″E | Compound volcano; active (last erupted on 1992 July 9 – August 16) |
| Mount Pinoonan | | 800 m (2,600 ft) | | Bohol | | 9°54′00″N 124°11′00″E | Highest in Bohol Island. |
| Mount Pinukis | | 1,532 m (5,026 ft) | | Zamboanga del Sur | | 7°59′00″N 123°14′00″E | Inactive volcano |
| Mount Peripen Bato | | | | Benguet | Cordillera Central | | |
| Mount Pitongbayog I | | 240 m (790 ft) | | Tarlac | | 15°34′00″N 120°23′00″E | Inactive volcano |
| Mount Pitongbayog II | | 282 m (925 ft) | | Tarlac | | 15°34′00″N 120°24′00″E | Inactive volcano |
| Mount Pocdol | | 1,102 m (3,615 ft) | | Albay, Sorsogon | Bicol Volcanic Belt | 13°03′00″N 123°57′30″E | Inactive volcano |
| Mount Pokgong | | | | Benguet | Cordillera Central | | |
| Mount Polis | | 1,895 m (6,217 ft) | | Ifugao | Cordillera Central | 16°58′29″N 121°01′45″E | |
| Mount Posang | | 1,540 m (5,050 ft) | | Abra | Cordillera Central | | |
| Mount Posooy | | 1,540 m (5,050 ft) | | Abra | Cordillera Central | 17°21′00″N 120°47′30″E | |
| Mount Proto‑labi | | 1,120 m (3,670 ft) | | Leyte | | 11°07′00″N 124°44′00″E | Inactive volcano |
| Mount Pudung | | 1,558 m (5,112 ft) | | Bukidnon | | 7°55′24″N 124°38′00″E | Inactive volcano |
| Mount Puguis | | 2,140 m (7,020 ft) | | Mountain Province | Cordillera Central | 17°03′37″N 121°05′39″E | |
| Mount Pulag | | 2,922 m (9,587 ft), 2,930 m, 2,830 m | 2,922 m (9,587 ft) | Ifugao, Benguet, Nueva Vizcaya | Cordillera Central | 16°35′52″N 120°53′56″E | Inactive volcano. Luzon's highest mountain. Situated at the Ifugao-Benguet-Nueva Vizcaya tripoint. |
| Mount Pulag Jr. | | | | Benguet | Cordillera Central | | |
| Mount Pultoc | | 1,565 m (5,135 ft) | | Abra | Cordillera Central | 17°33′32″N 120°56′03″E | |
| Mount Pulumbato | | 980 m (3,220 ft) | | Zamboanga | | 6°58′22″N 122°4′22″E | |
| Mount Puso | | | | Benguet | Cordillera Central | | |
| Mount Putianay | | 640 m (2,100 ft) | | Camarines Sur | | 13°49′07″N 123°29′52″E | |
| Mount Quebrada | | 1,020 m (3,350 ft) | | Ilocos Norte | | 18°29′27″N 120°48′11″E | |
| Mount Quezon | | 652 m (2,139 ft) | | Cotabato | | 6°35′00″N 124°57′00″E | Inactive volcano |
| Mount Quinali | | 915 m (3,002 ft) | | Ilocos Sur | Cordillera Central | 17°05′36″N 120°45′40″E | |
| Quipit Peak | | 899 m (2,949 ft) | | Zamboanga del Sur | | 7°45′42″N 122°29′24″E | |
| Mount Ragang(Piapayungan) | ‡ | 2,894 m (9,495 ft) | 1,590 m (5,220 ft) | Lanao del Sur | Piapayungan Range | 7°41′40″N 124°30′27″E | stratovolcano (active; last erupted in July 1916). Located near the Lanao del Sur-Cotabato border. |
| Razor Back Mountain | | 991 m (3,251 ft) | | Negros Oriental | | 10°07′33″N 123°11′53″E | |
| Mount Riposet | | 229 m (751 ft) | | Batanes | | 20°44′00″N 121°50′30″E | Inactive volcano |
| Rock Dome | | 1,099 m (3,606 ft) | | Sorsogon | | 13°03′00″N 123°58′00″E | |
| Mount Sabtang | | 346 m (1,135 ft) | | Batanes | | 20°19′00″N 121°52′00″E | Inactive volcano |
| Saddle Peak | | 1,028 m (3,373 ft) | | Camarines Sur | | 13°46′15″N 123°39′36″E | |
| Mount Sagada | | 1,127 m (3,698 ft) | | Lanao del Sur | | 8°07′06″N 124°25′20″E | Inactive volcano |
| Sagungan Peak | | 870 m (2,850 ft) | | Bohol | | 9°41′11″N 124°20′20″E | |
| Mount Salimbal | | 892 m (2,927 ft) | | Bukidnon | | 7°50′30″N 124°51′30″E | Inactive volcano |
| Mount Salucasog | | | | Benguet | Cordillera Central | | |
| Mount Samat | | 553 m (1,814 ft) | | Bataan | | 14°36′15″N 120°30′27″E | |
| Mount San Cristobal | † | 1,470 m (4,820 ft), 1,494 m | | Laguna, Quezon | | 14°03′52″N 121°25′36″E | Potentially active compound volcano. Located near the Laguna-Quezon border. |
| Mount San Isidro | | 787 m (2,582 ft) | | Pangasinan | | 15°59′00″N 120°07′00″E | |
| Mount Sandahan | | 392 m (1,286 ft) | | Sulu | | 5°54′30″N 121°18′00″E | Inactive volcano |
| Mount Sandig | | 1,299 m (4,262 ft) | | Abra | Cordillera Central | 17°47′44″N 121°05′40″E | |
| Mount Sansanan | | 1,286 m (4,219 ft) | | Antique, Iloilo | | 10°48′30″N 122°12′08″E | |
| Mount Santa Clara | | | | Nueva Vizcaya | | 16°14′00″N 121°01′00″E | |
| Mount Santa Rita | | 485 m (1,591 ft) | | Bataan | | 14°49′27″N 120°21′53″E | |
| Mount Santa Rosa | | 902 m (2,959 ft) | | Bataan | | 14°44′43″N 120°23′25″E | |
| Mount Santa Rosa | | 277 m (909 ft), 278 m | | Batanes | | 20°48′50″N 121°51′18″E | Inactive volcano |
| Mount Santo Tomas | | 2,251 m (7,385 ft), 2,256 m | | Benguet | Cordillera Central | 16°20′06″N 120°33′40″E | Inactive volcano |
| Saw Tooth Mountain | | 1,806 m (5,925 ft) | | Zambales, Tarlac | Zambales Mountains | 15°27′03″N 120°09′24″E | Located near the Zambales-Tarlac border. |
| Mount Sayao | | 1,266 m (4,154 ft) | | Biliran | | 11°32′00″N 124°35′00″E | Inactive volcano |
| Mount Sembrano | | 743 m (2,438 ft) | | Laguna, Rizal | | 14°23′08″N 121°22′00″E | Inactive volcano |
| Mount Semeneblen | | 1,465 m (4,806 ft) | | Ilocos Norte, Abra | Cordillera Central | | Located near the Ilocos Norte-Abra border. |
| Sharp Peak | | 701 m (2,300 ft) | | Catanduanes | | 13°38′00″N 124°09′00″E | |
| Sharp Peak | | | | Davao del Sur | | 5°49′00″N 125°30′00″E | |
| Sharp Peak | | 858 m (2,815 ft) | | Negros Oriental | | 9°11′45″N 122°58′01″E | |
| Sharp Peak | | 1,047 m (3,435 ft), 1,215 m | | Sorsogon | Bicol Volcanic Belt | 12°46′48″N 124°04′23″E | Inactive volcano |
| Mount Siasi | | 483 m (1,585 ft) | | Sulu | | 5°32′00″N 120°51′00″E | Inactive volcano |
| Mount Sibulan | | 1,292 m (4,239 ft) | | Davao | | 6°55′00″N 125°24′30″E | Inactive volcano |
| Sicaba Daku Peak (Sewahon, Siwahon, Pal‑it) | | 1,379 m (4,524 ft) | | Negros Occidental | | | |
| Sicaba Diutay Peak (Sicaba‑Diotay) | | 1,536 m (5,039 ft) | | Negros Occidental | | 10°47′00″N 123°14′00″E | |
| Mount Sicapoo | | 2,360 m (7,740 ft), 2,361 m | 1,581 m (5,187 ft) | Abra, Ilocos Norte | Cordillera Central | 18°00′54″N 120°56′15″E | |
| Mount Sigangan | | 282 m (925 ft) | | Sulu | | 5°33′30″N 120°47′30″E | Inactive volcano |
| Mount Sigayan | | 602 m (1,975 ft) | | Lanao | | 7°47′30″N 123°46′00″E | Inactive volcano |
| Mount Silad | | 1,009 m (3,310 ft) | | Bulacan | | 15°05′41″N 121°09′15″E | |
| Mount Silanganan | | 1,110 m (3,640 ft) | | Bataan | | 14°42′18″N 120°21′34″E | |
| Mount Silanguin | | | | Zambales | Zambales Mountains | 14°47′00″N 120°10′00″E | |
| Mount Silay | † | 1,510 m (4,950 ft), 1,534 m | | Negros Occidental | | 10°46′11″N 123°14′01″E | Potentially active stratovolcano |
| Mount Simara | | 229 m (751 ft) | | Romblon | | 12°49′00″N 122°03′00″E | Inactive volcano |
| Mount Sinako | | 1,590 m (5,220 ft) | | Davao del Norte | | 7°29′54″N 125°16′18″E | Inactive volcano |
| Mount Timbak (Singakalsa) | | 2,717 m (8,914 ft) | | Benguet | Cordillera Central | 16°39′00″N 120°47′00″E | |
| Mount Siningcapan | | 533 m (1,749 ft) | | Basilan | | 6°38′00″N 122°12′30″E | Inactive volcano |
| Sinumaan Volcano | † | 785 m (2,575 ft) | | Sulu | | 6°02′00″N 121°06′00″E | Potentially active cone volcano |
| Mount Sipitan | | 2,283 m (7,490 ft) | | Mountain Province | Cordillera Central | 17°10′00″N 120°53′00″E | |
| Sleeping Beauty | | | | Kalinga | Cordillera Central | 17°15′44″N 121°11′0″E | |
| Smith Volcano | ‡ | 688 m (2,257 ft) | | Cagayan | | 19°32′24″N 121°54′53″E | Cinder cone volcano (active; last erupted in 1924). Located on Babuyan Island. |
| Mount Sohoton (Sohotan) | | | | Samar | | 11°30′00″N 125°08′00″E | |
| Mount Solu | | 1,239 m (4,065 ft) | | Apayao | Cordillera Central | 18°07′00″N 121°13′00″E | |
| Mount Napulak | | 1,239 m (4,065 ft) | | Iloilo | Iloilo | | |
| South Peak | | 1,770 m (5,810 ft) | | Misamis Occidental | | | |
| South Peak Bulagao | | 1,104 m (3,622 ft) | | Abra | Cordillera Central | 17°38′00″N 120°31′00″E | |
| Sugarloaf Complex | | 1,432 m (4,698 ft) | | Zamboanga del Sur | | 8°00′N 123°15′E | Inactive volcano |
| Mount Sugutin | | 366 m (1,201 ft) | | Camarines Sur | | | |
| Mount Suiro | | 1,301 m (4,268 ft) | | Biliran | | 11°32′00″N 124°34′00″E | |
| Mount Sumagaya | | 2,320 m (7,610 ft), 2,248 m | | Misamis Oriental | | 8°39′00″N 125°02′00″E | |
| Mount Sumagbao | | 823 m (2,700 ft) | | Bulacan | | | |
| Mount Sumao | | 870 m (2,850 ft) | | Bulacan | | | |
| Mount Sungal | | 518 m (1,699 ft) | | Sulu | | 6°01′30″N 121°04′30″E | Inactive volcano |
| Mount Sungay | | 620 m (2,030 ft), 752 m | | Cavite | | 14°08′31″N 121°01′19″E | Inactive volcano |
| Mount Susungdalaga | | 799 m (2,621 ft) | | Rizal | | 14°37′51″N 121°18′40″E | |
| Mount Tabernaculo | | 775 m (2,543 ft) | | Bulacan | | 15°00′33″N 121°10′44″E | |
| Mount Tabayoc | | 2,820 m (9,250 ft) | 184 m (604 ft) | Ifugao | Cordillera Central | 16°41′21″N 120°53′10″E | |
| Table | | 576 m (1,890 ft) | | Cotabato | | 7°28′00″N 124°48′00″E | Inactive volcano |
| Mount Tabuanan | | 929 m (3,048 ft) | | Biliran | | 11°40′00″N 124°24′00″E | Inactive volcano |
| Mount Tagoan | | 1,143 m (3,750 ft) | | Bukidnon | | 7°47′00″N 124°48′00″E | Inactive volcano |
| Mount Tagubud | | 2,670 m (8,760 ft) | 2,580 m (8,460 ft) | Davao de Oro | | 7°26′30″N 126°13′48″E | |
| Mount Tagpaya | | | | Benguet | Cordillera Central | | |
| Mount Taguite | | | | Zamboanga del Sur | | 7°17′31″N 122°16′52″E | |
| Mount Talampac | | | | Abra | Cordillera Central | 17°49′00″N 120°53′00″E | |
| Mount Talim | | 421 m (1,381 ft) | | Rizal | | 14°21′N 121°15′E | Inactive volcano |
| Mount Talipao | | 391 m (1,283 ft) | | Sulu | | 5°57′00″N 121°04′30″E | Inactive volcano |
| Talisay Caldera | | 500 m (1,600 ft) | | Batangas | | 14°02′00″N 121°00′00″E | Inactive volcano |
| Mount Talitig | | 385 m (1,263 ft) | | Camarines Sur | | 13°21′N 123°15′E | |
| Mount Talomo | | 2,674 m (8,773 ft), 2,601 m | 513 m (1,683 ft) | Davao/Cotabato | Apo–Talomo Mountain range | 7°02′00″N 125°20′00″E | Inactive volcano |
| Mount Tamburok | | 437 m (1,434 ft) | | Leyte | | 11°33′00″N 124°26′00″E | Inactive volcano |
| Mount Tamlong | | 249 m (817 ft) | | Laguna | | 14°05′00″N 121°14′30″E | Inactive volcano |
| Mount Tangdi | | 1,154 m (3,786 ft) | | Sulu | | 6°29′00″N 125°24′24″E | Inactive volcano |
| Mount Tangob | | 1,356 m (4,449 ft) | | Kalinga | Cordillera Central | 17°15′37″N 121°15′33″E | |
| Mount Tankulan (Tangkulang) | | 1,678 m (5,505 ft) | | Bukidnon | Kitanglad Range | | |
| Tanza Hill | | 260 m (850 ft) | | Laguna | | 14°02′00″N 121°15′30″E | Inactive volcano |
| Mount Tapiantana | | 249 m (817 ft) | | Basilan | | 6°18′00″N 121°57′30″E | Inactive volcano |
| Mount Tapha | | 779 m (2,556 ft) | | Cagayan | Sierra Madre | 18°20′23″N 122°11′55″E | |
| Mount Tapul | | 473 m (1,552 ft) | | Sulu | | 5°44′00″N 120°54′00″E | Inactive volcano |
| Mount Tapulao (High Peak) | | 2,037 m (6,683 ft), 2,038 m | | Zambales | Zambales Mountains | 15°28′57″N 120°07′14″E | Highest in Zambales province. |
| Mount Taran | | 811 m (2,661 ft) | | Sulu | | 5°59′12″N 120°55′54″E | Inactive volcano |
| Mount Tarranosa | | 360 m (1,180 ft) | | Zamboanga del Sur | | 7°32′00″N 123°08′30″E | Inactive volcano |
| Mount Tayawan | | | | Benguet | Cordillera Central | | |
| The Teeth | | 1,598 m (5,243 ft) | | Palawan | | 9°22′00″N 118°18′00″E | |
| Mount Tenglawan | | | | Benguet | Cordillera Central | | |
| Three Sisters | | 1,441 m (4,728 ft) | | Ilocos Sur | Cordillera Central | | |
| Thumb Peak | | 1,149 m (3,770 ft), 1,787 m | | Isabela | Sierra Madre | 17°30′00″N 122°08′00″E | |
| Thumb Peak | | 1,787 m (5,863 ft) | | Palawan | | | |
| Mount Ticalan | | 1,041 m (3,415 ft) | | Bukidnon | | 8°07′30″N 124°41′00″E | Inactive volcano |
| Mount Ticmo | | 1,826 m (5,991 ft) | | Abra | Cordillera Central | 17°30′08″N 120°58′26″E | |
| Mount Tigas | | 1,450 m (4,760 ft) | | Capiz, Antique | | 11°17′38″N 122°11′27″E | |
| Mount Tigbi | | 314 m (1,030 ft) | | Camarines Sur | | 13°32′21″N 123°01′33″E | |
| Mount Tiis | | 610 m (2,000 ft) | | Camarines Sur | | 13°50′00″N 123°32′00″E | |
| Mount Tinadagan (Tinadanan) | | 1,969 m (6,460 ft) | | Mountain Province | Cordillera Central | | |
| Mount Tirad | | 1,154 m (3,786 ft) | | Ilocos Sur | | 17°08′00″N 120°38′00″E | Site of the 1899 Battle of Tirad Pass. |
| Mount Tombol Hill | | 234 m (768 ft) | | Batangas | | 13°51′00″N 121°11′00″E | Inactive volcano |
| Mount Tres Marias | | 771 m (2,530 ft) | | Camiguin | | 9°11′36″N 124°41′01″E | Inactive volcano |
| Triple Peak | | 639 m (2,096 ft), 638 m | | Camarines Sur | | 13°43′12″N 123°48′27″E | |
| Mount Tugawi | | | | Benguet | Cordillera Central | | |
| Tukay Volcano | † | 609 m (1,998 ft) | | Sulu | | 5°56′00″N 120°57′00″E | Potentially active cone volcano |
| Mount Tumatangas (Tumatangas Volcano) | † | 811 m (2,661 ft) | | Sulu | | 5°59′09″N 120°57′07″E | Potentially active cinder cone volcano |
| Mount Tuminungan | | 2,706 m (8,878 ft) | | Bukidnon | Kitanglad Range | | |
| Tusk Peak | | 904 m (2,966 ft) | | Occidental Mindoro | | 12°41′03″N 120°59′38″E | |
| Twin Peaks | | 981 m (3,219 ft), 958 m | | Cagayan | Sierra Madre | 17°50′43″N 122°06′06″E | |
| Mount Uac | | 592 m (1,942 ft), 593 m | | Masbate | | 12°12′29″N 123°39′36″E | |
| Mount Ugu | | 2,090 m (6,860 ft) | | Nueva Vizcaya | | 16°19′09″N 120°48′06″E | (May refer to "Mount Ugo" in Benguet near the border between Nueva Vizcaya). |
| Mount Ukan | | 299 m (981 ft) | | Sulu | | 5°55′00″N 121°16′30″E | Inactive volcano |
| Mount Uling | | 659 m (2,162 ft) | | Cebu | | 10°17′41″N 123°42′45″E | |
| Unnamed peak | | 640 m (2,100 ft) | | Cotabato | | 6°56′00″N 125°08′30″E | Inactive volcano |
| Unnamed peak | | 982 m (3,222 ft) | | Cotabato | | 6°53′30″N 125°08′00″E | Inactive volcano |
| Unnamed peak | | 356 m (1,168 ft) | | Cotabato | | 6°51′30″N 125°09′00″E | Inactive volcano |
| Unnamed peak | | 592 m (1,942 ft) | | Cotabato | | 6°50′30″N 125°08′00″E | Inactive volcano |
| Unnamed peak | | 804 m (2,638 ft) | | Cotabato | | 6°53′30″N 125°06′30″E | Inactive volcano |
| Unnamed peak | | 788 m (2,585 ft) | | Cotabato | | 6°53′00″N 125°06′00″E | Inactive volcano |
| Unnamed peak | | 650 m (2,130 ft) | | Cotabato | | 6°55′00″N 125°05′00″E | Inactive volcano |
| Unnamed peak | | 444 m (1,457 ft) | | Cotabato | | 6°52′30″N 125°04′00″E | Inactive volcano |
| Unnamed peak | | 497 m (1,631 ft) | | Cotabato | | 6°51′00″N 125°04′30″E | Inactive volcano |
| Unnamed peak | | 798 m (2,618 ft) | | Cotabato | | 6°51′30″N 125°06′00″E | Inactive volcano |
| Unnamed peak | | 592 m (1,942 ft) | | Cotabato | | 6°50′15″N 125°06′30″E | Inactive volcano |
| Unnamed peak | | 624 m (2,047 ft) | | Cotabato | | 6°50′00″N 125°06′00″E | Inactive volcano |
| Unnamed peak | | 542 m (1,778 ft) | | Cotabato | | 6°49′00″N 125°06′30″E | Inactive volcano |
| Unnamed peak | | 400 m (1,300 ft) | | Cotabato | | 6°48′30″N 125°06′15″E | Inactive volcano |
| Unnamed peak | | 302 m (991 ft) | | Cotabato | | 6°47′45″N 125°06′00″E | Inactive volcano |
| Unnamed peak | | 208 m (682 ft) | | Cotabato | | 6°46′00″N 125°07′00″E | Inactive volcano |
| Unnamed peak | | 792 m (2,598 ft) | | Cotabato | | 6°52′15″N 126°06′00″E | Inactive volcano |
| Unnamed peak | | 300 m (980 ft) | | Lanao | | 7°56′30″N 123°50′30″E | Inactive volcano |
| Unnamed peak | | 280 m (920 ft) | | Lanao | | 7°55′45″N 123°50′30″E | Inactive volcano |
| Unnamed peak | | 275 m (902 ft) | | Lanao | | 7°52′00″N 123°51′00″E | Inactive volcano |
| Unnamed peak | | 259 m (850 ft) | | Lanao | | 7°52′30″N 123°51′30″E | Inactive volcano |
| Unnamed peak | | 260 m (850 ft) | | Lanao | | 7°57′15″N 123°51′30″E | Inactive volcano |
| Unnamed peak | | 250 m (820 ft) | | Lanao | | 7°57′30″N 123°52′00″E | Inactive volcano |
| Unnamed peak | | 270 m (890 ft) | | Lanao | | 7°57′00″N 123°52′30″E | Inactive volcano |
| Unnamed peak | | 358 m (1,175 ft) | | Lanao | | 7°54′00″N 123°53′30″E | Inactive volcano |
| Unnamed peak | | 394 m (1,293 ft) | | Lanao | | 7°56′00″N 123°55′30″E | Inactive volcano |
| Unnamed peak | | 498 m (1,634 ft) | | Lanao | | 7°57′30″N 123°54′30″E | Inactive volcano |
| Unnamed peak | | 234 m (768 ft) | | Albay | | 13°13′00″N 123°36′00″E | Inactive volcano |
| Unnamed peak | | 200 m (660 ft) | | Albay | | 13°14′00″N 123°36′00″E | Inactive volcano |
| Unnamed peak | | 282 m (925 ft) | | Albay | | 13°13′30″N 123°35′00″E | Inactive volcano |
| Unnamed peak | | 219 m (719 ft) | | Albay | | 13°14′30″N 123°34′30″E | Inactive volcano |
| Unnamed peak | | 274 m (899 ft) | | Albay | | 13°14′00″N 123°33′30″E | Inactive volcano |
| Unnamed peak | | 220 m (720 ft) | | Albay | | 13°13′30″N 123°33′15″E | Inactive volcano |
| Unnamed peak | | 236 m (774 ft) | | Zamboanga del Sur | | 7°53′30″N 123°35′00″E | Inactive volcano |
| Unnamed peak | | 200 m (660 ft) | | Zamboanga del Sur | | 7°53′30″N 123°33′30″E | Inactive volcano |
| Unnamed peak | | 319 m (1,047 ft) | | Zamboanga del Sur | | 7°54′30″N 123°33′30″E | Inactive volcano |
| Unnamed peak | | 276 m (906 ft) | | Zamboanga del Sur | | 7°56′00″N 123°33′00″E | Inactive volcano |
| Unnamed peak | | 492 m (1,614 ft) | | Zamboanga del Sur | | 7°55′00″N 123°32′30″E | Inactive volcano |
| Unnamed peak | | 471 m (1,545 ft) | | Zamboanga del Sur | | 7°55′30″N 123°31′00″E | Inactive volcano |
| Unnamed peak | | 200 m (660 ft) | | Zamboanga del Sur | | 7°57′00″N 123°31′00″E | Inactive volcano |
| Unnamed peak | | 366 m (1,201 ft) | | Zamboanga del Sur | | 7°55′00″N 123°30′00″E | Inactive volcano |
| Unnamed peak | | 360 m (1,180 ft) | | Zamboanga del Sur | | 7°57′00″N 123°29′00″E | Inactive volcano |
| Unnamed peak | | 331 m (1,086 ft) | | Zamboanga del Sur | | 7°56′00″N 123°28′30″E | Inactive volcano |
| Unnamed peak | | 590 m (1,940 ft) | | Zamboanga del Sur | | 7°57′30″N 123°27′30″E | Inactive volcano |
| Mount Urot | | 430 m (1,410 ft) | | Sulu | | 5°59′00″N 121°15′30″E | Inactive volcano |
| Mount Van Schaik | | 1,400 m (4,600 ft) | | Oriental Mindoro | | 12°45′00″N 121°19′00″E | |
| Mount Verde | | 364 m (1,194 ft) | | Batangas | | 13°34′00″N 121°05′00″E | Inactive volcano |
| Victoria Peaks (Mount Victoria) | | 1,709 m (5,607 ft), 727 m | 1,619 m (5,312 ft) | Palawan | | 09°21′54″N 118°20′03″E | |
| Volcanic Cone | | 717 m (2,352 ft) | | Sorsogon | Bicol Volcanic Belt | 13°04′00″N 123°57′00″E | |
| Vulcan | | 1,014 m (3,327 ft) | | Biliran | | 11°32′00″N 124°30′00″E | Inactive volcano |
| Vulcan | | 580 m (1,900 ft) | | Camiguin | | 9°12′48″N 124°38′48″E | Inactive volcano |
| Mount Wayan | | 1,176 m (3,858 ft) | | Apayao | Cordillera Central | 17°51′52″N 121°09′41″E | |
| Mount Wood | | 1,960 m (6,430 ft) | | Oriental Mindoro | | 12°44′42″N 121°12′32″E | |
| Mount Yami | | 211 m (692 ft) | | Batanes | | 21°07′00″N 121°57′00″E | Inactive volcano |
| Mount Yangbaw | | | | Benguet | Cordillera Central | | |

[top]

== Gallery ==
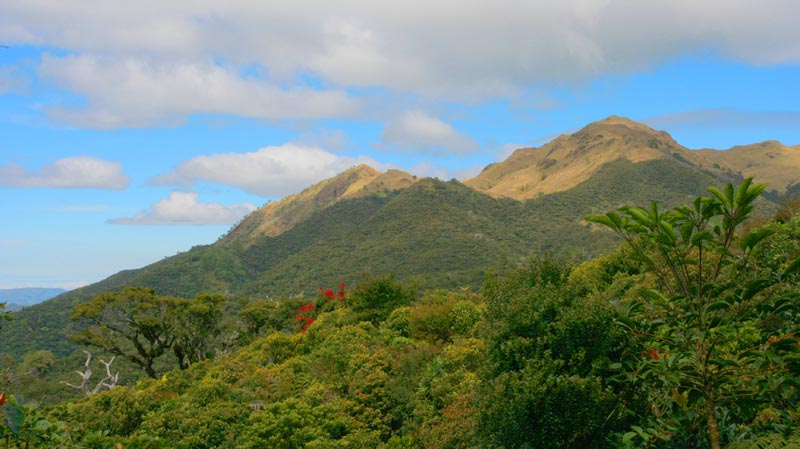
Pulag, highest in Luzon

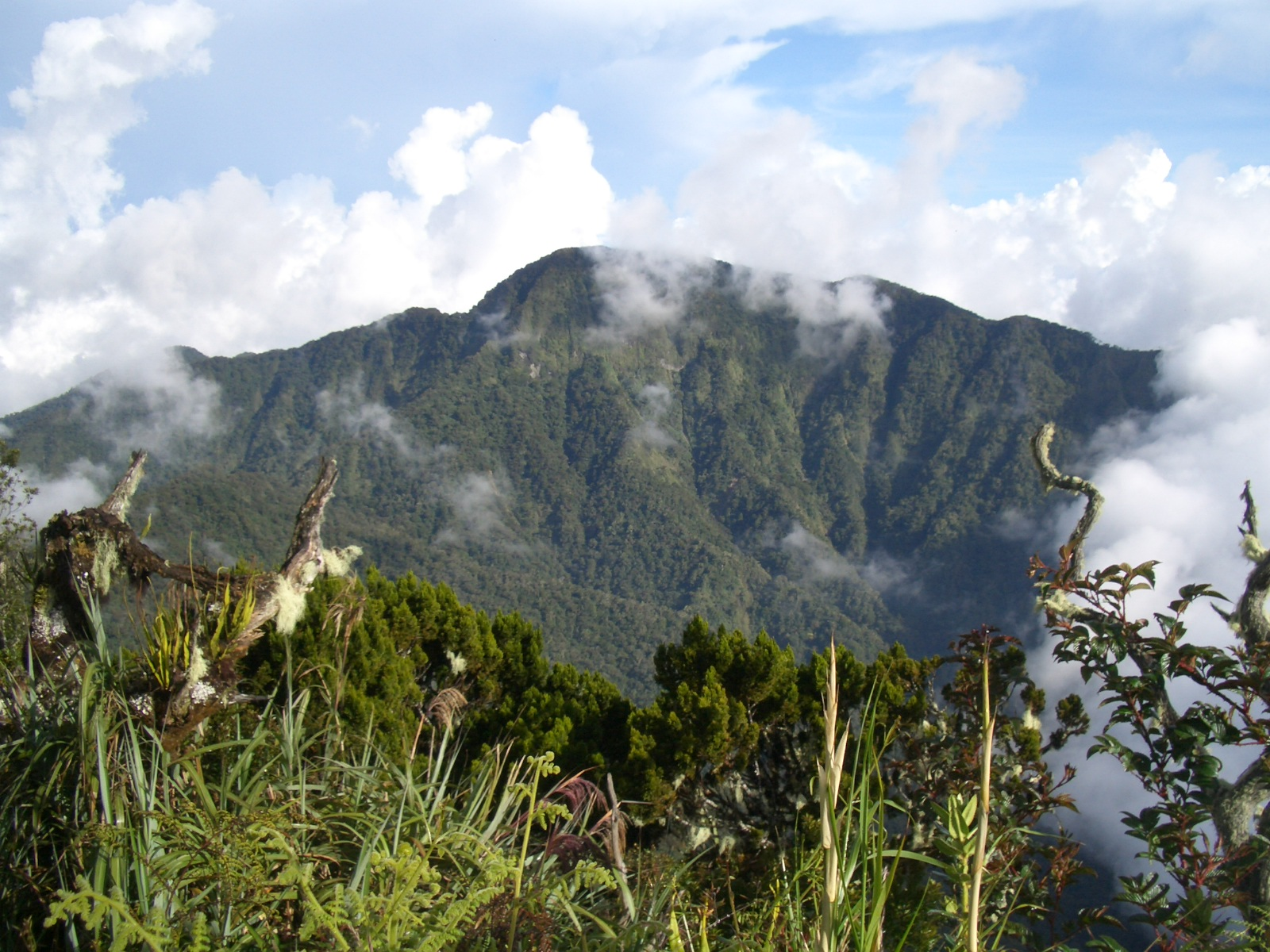
Dulang-dulang, Philippines' 2nd highest

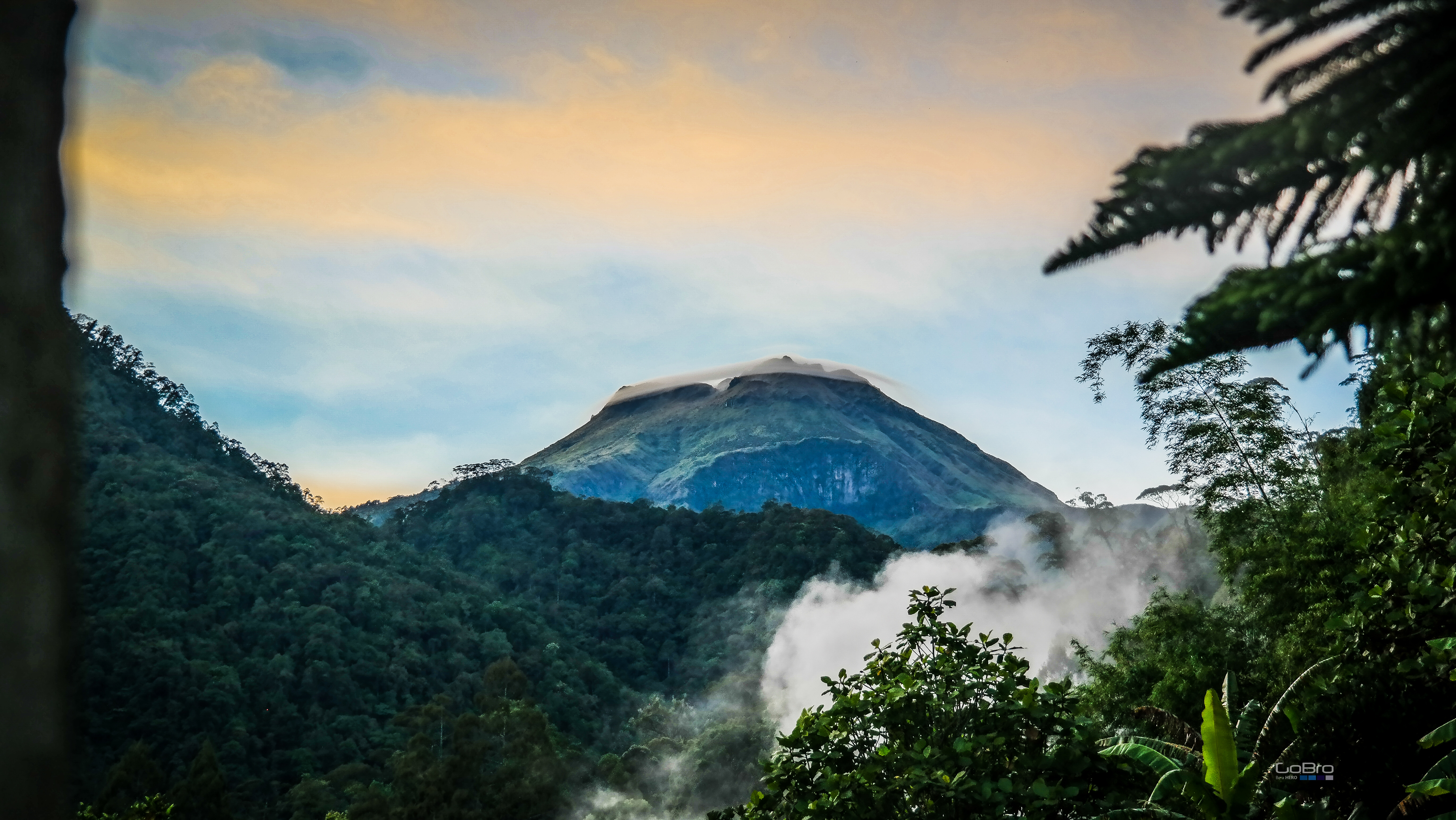
Apo, highest in Mindanao and all of the Philippines

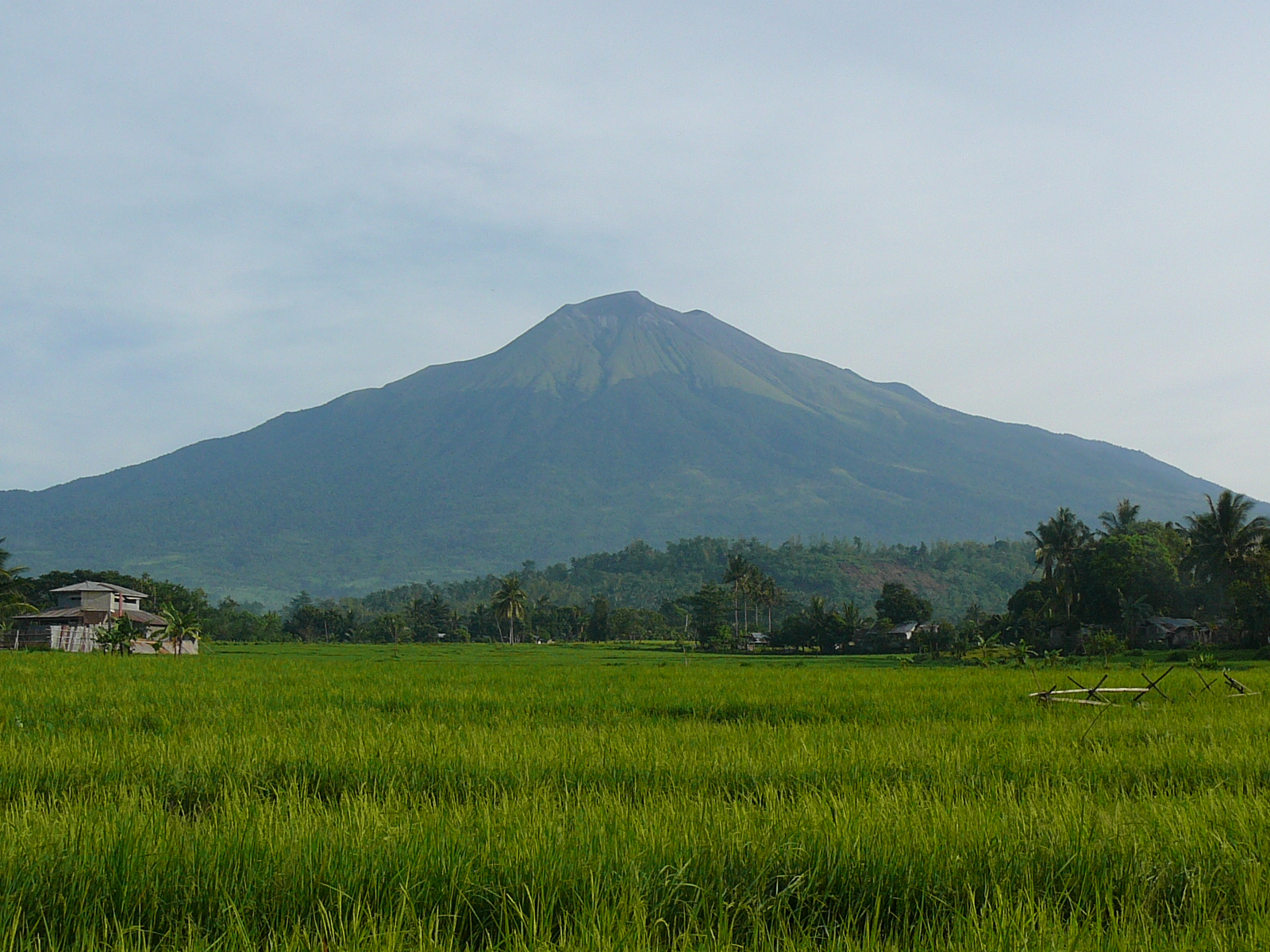
Kanlaon, highest in the Visayas

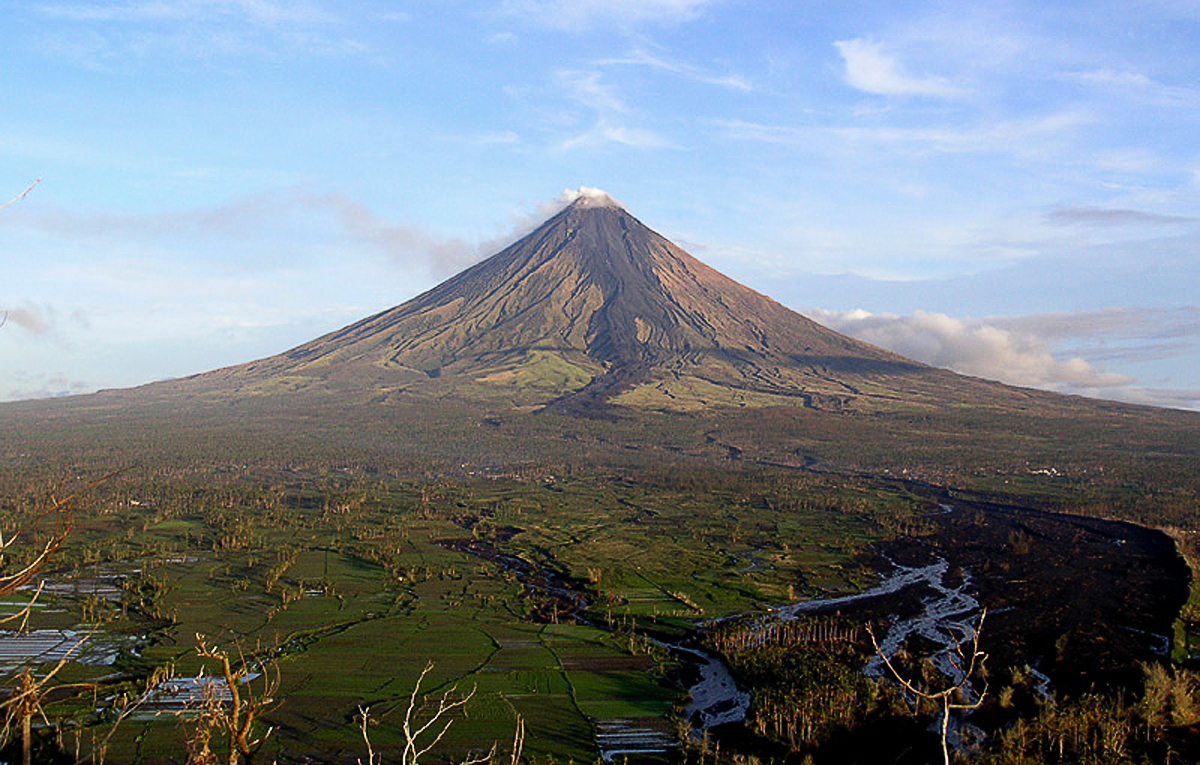
Mayon, highest in the Bicol Region

== See also ==
- List of Ultras of the Philippines
- List of Philippine provinces and regions by highest point
- List of volcanoes in the Philippines
  - List of active volcanoes in the Philippines
  - List of potentially active volcanoes in the Philippines
  - List of inactive volcanoes in the Philippines
- Geography of the Philippines
