= Paco (disambiguation) =

Paco is a nickname for the Spanish name Francisco.

Paco may also refer to:

== Arts and entertainment ==
- Paco (film), 2009 Argentine film
- Paco (band), American indie rock band
- Palo Alto Chamber Orchestra, an American youth orchestra
- Paco (character), a DC Comics character
- Paco, the protagonist of the Ernest Hemingway short story "The Capital of the World"
- Prince Paco, the protagonist of the arcade game Marvel Land
- Paco, a fictional martial artist played by Paulo Tocha in the film Bloodsport

== People ==
- Paco (surname)
- Paco Jémez (born 1970), Spanish retired footballer

== Other uses ==
- Cocaine paste, short for pasta de cocaína
- Paco (volcano), a volcano in the Philippines
- Paco, Manila, a district of Manila, Philippines
  - Paco Catholic School
  - Paco Church
  - Paco Park
- PACO (magazine), an Esperanto magazine
