= Mount Sibulan =

Inactive volcano in Davao del Sur, Philippines

- Location within Mindanao mainland Location within Philippines

Highest point
- Peak: Abuno Peak
- Elevation: 1,292 m (4,239 ft)
- Prominence: 102 m (335 ft)
- Listing: Mountains in the Philippines
- Coordinates: 6°55′08″N 125°24′20″E

Geography
- Location: Mindanao
- Country: Philippines
- Province: Davao del Sur
- Region: Davao
- Settlement: Santa Cruz
- Parent range: Apo–Talomo Mountain range

Geology
- Mountain type: Inactive volcano

Mount Sibulan is an inactive volcano located in Santa Cruz, Davao del Sur near a resort called Forest Hill Resort in the province of Region XI. It is located within Mount Apo Natural Park.
