= Mount Tabayoc =

Mountain in Benguet, Philippines

- Mount Tabayoc
- Location within Luzon Location within Philippines

Highest point
- Elevation: 2,842 m (9,324 ft)
- Prominence: 536 m (1,759 ft)
- Listing: Philippines high peaks 7th
- Coordinates: 16°41′21.3″N 120°53′09.9″E

Geography
- Location: Luzon
- Country: Philippines
- Region: Cordillera Administrative Region
- Parent range: Cordillera Central

Mount Tabayoc is an enchanted mountain located in Brgy. Ballay, Kabayan, Benguet, in the Cordillera Administrative Region of the Philippines. It has a total height of 2,842 metres (9,324 ft) above sea level, making the sixth highest mountain in the Philippines and second highest peak in the island of Luzon.
