= Cancajanag =

Volcano in the Philippines

Coordinates: 11°04′00″N 124°47′00″E

Cancajang

Highest point
- Elevation: 900 m (3,000 ft)

Geography
- Location: Leyte, Philippines

Geology
- Rock age: Unknown
- Mountain type: Complex volcano
- Last eruption: Unknown possibly Holocene

Cancajanag is located within the municipal boundary of Dagami in the province of Leyte, on the island of Leyte, Region VIII, of the Philippines. It is located within the barangays of Bouglayor and San Agustin.

== Physical features ==
Cancajanag is classified by Philippine volcanologists as a potentially active dome complex volcano with an elevation of 900 meters and a base diameter of 4 kilometres. It is one of the 18 volcanoes in the province.

It has a hot spring, Mainit Spring (Anahawan) with a temperature range of 63.4 °C to 63.9 °C,

Adjacent Volcanic Edifices are Alto Peak which is 6.2 cadastral km NNW of Cancajanag, and Lobi which is 6.6 cadastral km SSE of Cancajanag.

Predominant rock type is andesite.

== See also ==
- List of active volcanoes in the Philippines
- List of potentially active volcanoes in the Philippines
- List of inactive volcanoes in the Philippines
- Philippine Institute of Volcanology and Seismology
