= List of potentially active volcanoes in the Philippines =

This is a list of potentially active volcanoes in the Philippines, as classified by the Philippine Institute of Volcanology and Seismology.

== List ==
Name	Elevation (ASL)		Coordinates	Province(s)	Last eruption
Name	m	ft	Coordinates	Province(s)	Last eruption
Amorong	376	1,234	15°49′41″N 120°48′18″E	Pangasinan	Pleistocene
Apo	2,954	9,692	7°00′29″N 125°16′12″E	Cotabato, Davao del Sur	unknown possibly 1640s
Arayat	1,026	3,366	15°12′00″N 120°44′31″E	Pampanga	Holocene
Balatukan	2,450	8,040	8°46′N 124°59′E	Misamis Oriental	Pleistocene
Balut	852	2,795	5°24′00″N 125°22′30″E	Sarangani, Davao Occidental	Holocene
Cancajanag	900	3,000	10°24′43″N 124°31′55″E	Leyte	—
Cuernos de Negros	1,862	6,109	9°15′29″N 123°10′30″E	Negros Oriental	12,000 BC
Dakut	474	1,555	5°26′N 120°34′E	Sulu	—
Kalatungan	2,824	9,265	7°57′N 124°48′E	Bukidnon	Holocene
Labo	943	3,094	14°01′12″N 122°47′31″E	Camarines Norte	27,000 BP
Laguna Caldera	743	2,438	14°25′N 121°16′E	Laguna	28,000 BP
Latukan	2,158	7,080	7°39′N 124°28′E	Lanao del Sur	Holocene
Mahagnao	800	2,600	10°52′19″N 124°51′11″E	Leyte	—
Malinao	1,548	5,079	13°25′19″N 123°35′49″E	Albay	1980
Malindig	1,157	3,796	13°14′24″N 122°01′05″E	Marinduque	—
Mandalagan	1,879	6,165	10°39′N 123°15′E	Negros Occidental	Holocene
Mariveles	1,388	4,554	14°31′N 120°28′E	Bataan	4000 BP
Natib	1,287	4,222	14°42′18″N 120°24′00″E	Bataan	Holocene
Panay	501	1,644	13°43′23″N 120°53′35″E	Batangas	Pleistocene
San Cristobal	1,470	4,820	14°04′N 121°26′E	Laguna, Quezon	—
Santo Tomas	2,260	7,410	16°20′N 120°33′E	Benguet	1641
Silay	1,535	5,036	10°46′N 123°14′E	Negros Occidental	Holocene

== Gallery ==
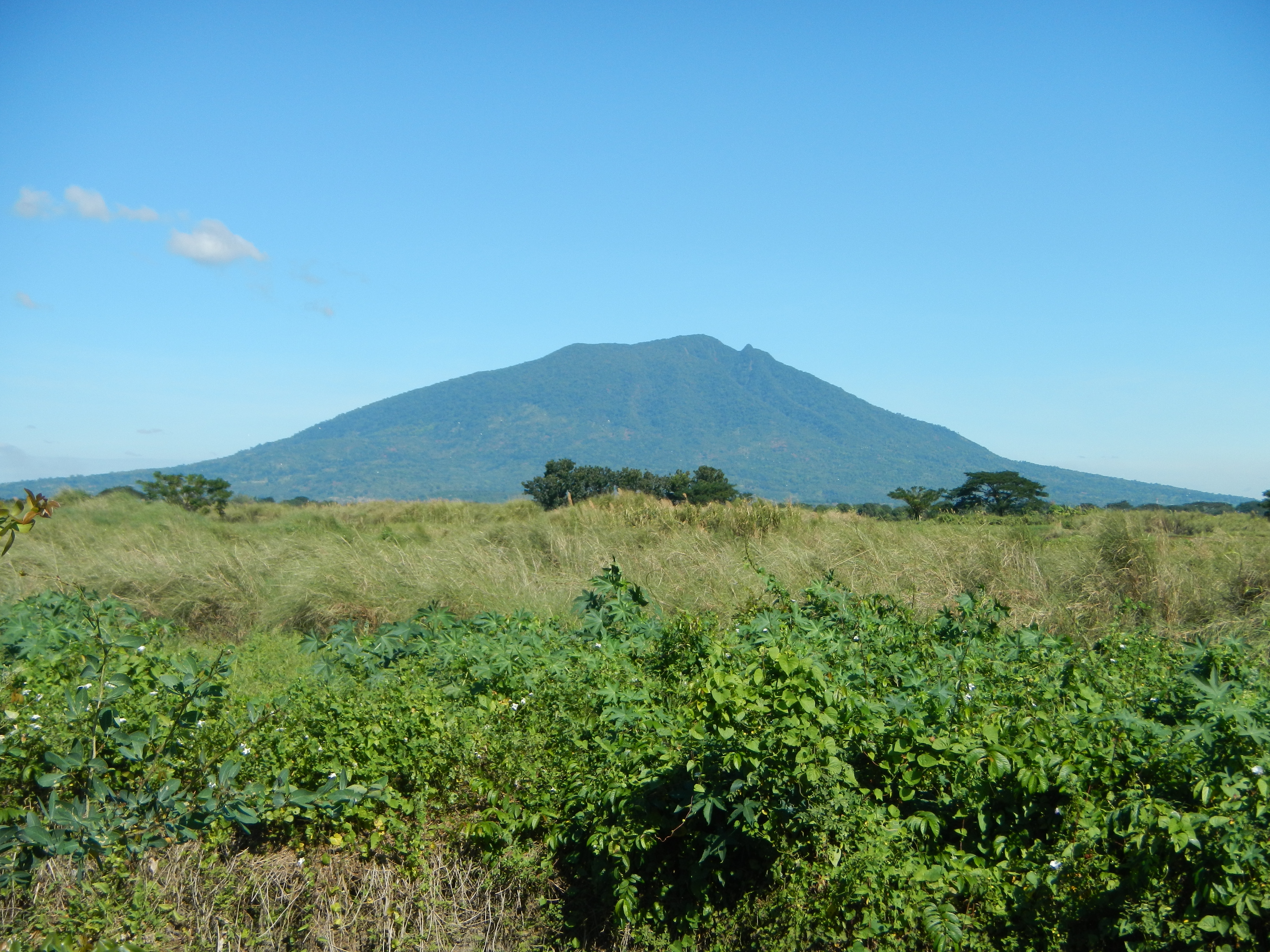
Arayat in Pampanga

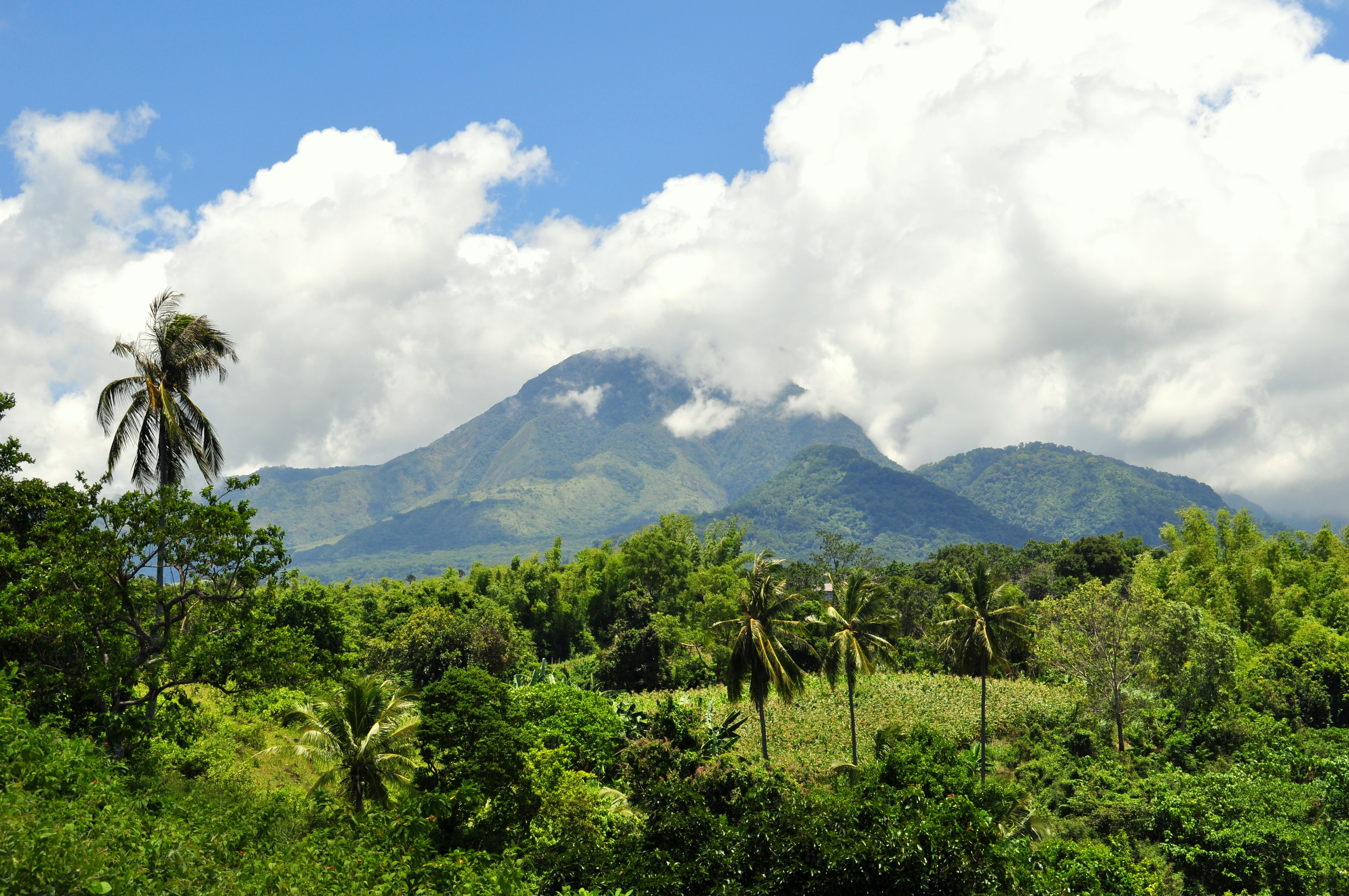
Cuernos de Negros in Negros Island

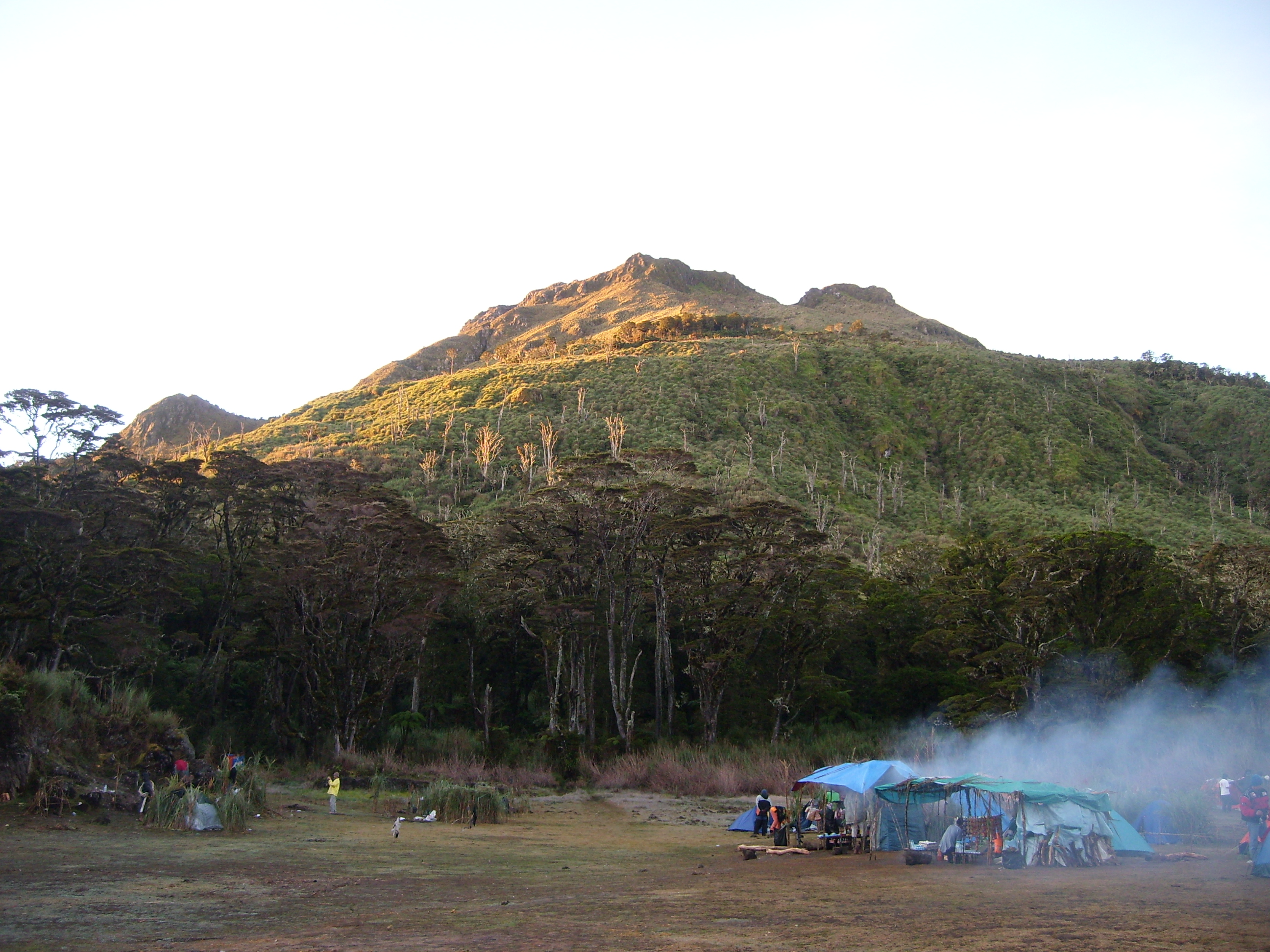
Apo in Davao del Sur

== See also ==
- List of active volcanoes in the Philippines
- List of inactive volcanoes in the Philippines
- List of mountains in the Philippines

== Sources ==
- Philippine Institute of Volcanology and Seismology (PHIVOLCS) Potentially Active Volcano list
- Philippine Institute of Volcanology and Seismology (PHIVOLCS) Active Volcano list
- Philippine Institute of Volcanology and Seismology (PHIVOLCS) Inactive Volcano list
