= Dakut =

Volcano in the Philippines

Highest point
- Elevation: 474 m (1,555 ft)
- Coordinates: 5°4′00″N 120°56′00″E

Geography
- Location: Sulu, ARMM, Philippines

Geology
- Mountain type: Stratovolcano
- Last eruption: Unknown

Dakut is located in the province of Sulu, in the Bangsamoro Autonomous Region in Muslim Mindanao, of the Philippines.

== Physical features ==
Dakut is classified by Philippine volcanologists as a potentially active volcano, with an elevation of 474 meters. It is situated on Tapul island.

Its physical form and predominant rock type are not recorded.

Its tectonic setting is the Sulu Arc, an area of political unrest, with many understudied volcanic forms.

== See also ==
- List of active volcanoes in the Philippines
- List of potentially active volcanoes in the Philippines
- List of inactive volcanoes in the Philippines
- Philippine Institute of Volcanology and Seismology
- Volcano
