= Variant name (geography) =

Geography terminology

Variant name is a term used to specify the name of a geographic feature that is not the primary name used for that feature. Variant names usually have historical significance but have been superseded by another name that currently has more widespread use.

The term "variant name" as used in the Geographic Names Information System of the United States Geological Survey is a part of American National Standards Institute standard ANSI INCITS 446-2008.
