= Mount Panay =

Volcano in the Batangas region of the Philippines

- Location within Philippines

Highest point
- Elevation: 501 m (1,644 ft)
- Listing: potentially active volcano
- Coordinates: 13°43′23″N 120°53′35″E

Geography
- Location: Luzon
- Country: Philippines
- Region: Calabarzon
- Province: Batangas

Geology
- Mountain type: Stratovolcano
- Volcanic arc: Luzon Volcanic Arc
- Last eruption: Middle Pleistocene

Mount Panay is a potentially active stratovolcano located in the province of Batangas, Philippines.

== Geography ==
Panay is located south of Taal Lake, in the province of Batangas, Philippines.

It is located at the southern end of the Calumpang Peninsula, which forms the western side of Batangas Bay, at latitude 13.723°N (13°43'24"N), longitude 120.893°E (120°53'36"E).

== Physical features ==
Panay is a forested, low, andesitic stratovolcano, on the western side of Batangas Bay, which could be a breached caldera inundated by the sea.

Panay has an elevation of 501 metres (1,644 feet) asl.

Panay is reported to be strongly solfataric at present.

== Eruptions ==
Last eruptive activity is thought to be Pleistocene, about 500,000 years ago.

There have been no historical eruptions.

== Geology ==
Rock type is predominantly andesite.

Tectonically, Panay lies at the intersection of two major regional trends, the Bataan Lineament and the Palawan-Macolod Lineament.

Batangas Bay, which includes Panay, may be a drowned caldera.

== Listings ==
Smithsonian Institution lists Panay as Pleistocene - Fumarolic.

Philippines Institute of Volcanology and Seismology (Phivolcs) lists Panay as Inactive.

== See also ==
- List of active volcanoes in the Philippines
- List of potentially active volcanoes in the Philippines
- List of inactive volcanoes in the Philippines
- Philippine Institute of Volcanology and Seismology
- Pacific ring of fire
