= Mount Amorong =

Volcano on the island of Luzon, Philippines

- Location within Luzon Location within Philippines

Highest point
- Elevation: 376 m (1,234 ft)
- Coordinates: 15°49′41″N 120°48′18″E

Geography
- Country: Philippines
- Region: Ilocos Region
- Province: Pangasinan

Geology
- Mountain type: Lava dome
- Volcanic arc: Luzon Volcanic Arc
- Last eruption: Pleistocene

Mount Amorong a potentially active lava dome, part of the Amorong Volcanic Group, is located at the northern end of Central Luzon in Umingan, Pangasinan, Region I, on the island of Luzon, in the Philippines.

== Physical features ==
Mount Amorong is one of a cluster of small lava domes and diatremes. It is the only one which currently exhibits any volcanic-related activities, being fumarolic and solfataric.

== Listings ==
Philippine Institute of Volcanology and Seismology (PHIVOLCS) lists Amorong as potentially active volcano.

The Smithsonian Institution lists Amorong as being Fumarolic.

== Eruptions ==
The date of the last eruption is unknown, but possibly more than 1 million years before present.

== Geology ==
The volcano's rock type is principally trachyandesite.

K-Ar dating of about 1.14 million years was obtained from the Amorong volcanic group.

It lies along the Eastern Bataan volcanic lineament of the Philippines.

== See also ==
- List of active volcanoes in the Philippines
- List of potentially active volcanoes in the Philippines
- List of inactive volcanoes in the Philippines
- Pacific Ring of Fire
