= Latukan =

Volcano in Lanao del Sur, Philippines

- Location within Mindanao mainland Location within Philippines

Highest point
- Elevation: 2,280 m (7,480 ft)
- Listing: Potentially active volcano
- Coordinates: 7°39′14″N 124°26′17″E

Geography
- Country: Philippines
- Region: BARMM
- Province: Lanao del Sur

Geology
- Mountain type: Stratovolcano
- Last eruption: Pleistocene

Latukan Volcano is a potentially active stratovolcano in the centre of a chain of young E-W-trending stratovolcanoes in northwest Mindanao, southeast of Lake Lanao, province of Lanao del Sur, island of Mindanao, in the Bangsamoro Autonomous Region in Muslim Mindanao.

The Global Volcanism Program records its elevation as 2,280 metres (7,480 ft) at a latitude of 7.654°N and longitude of 124.438°E.

The Philippine Institute of Volcanology and Seismology (PHIVOLCS) lists Latukan as an inactive volcano, without any indication as to why it considers Latukan to be inactive.

Like most volcanoes in southern Philippines, Latukan has not been well studied.

== See also ==
- List of active volcanoes in the Philippines
- List of potentially active volcanoes in the Philippines
- List of inactive volcanoes in the Philippines
- Philippine Institute of Volcanology and Seismology
