= Paco (surname) =

Paco or Paço is a surname. Notable people with the surname include:

- Alain Paco (born 1952), French rugby union coach and former player
- Janaq Paço (1914-1991), Albanian sculptor
- Marianela Paco (born 1976), Bolivian journalist, lawyer, and politician
- Viktor Paço (born 1974), Albanian former footballer

== See also ==
- Raffaele di Paco (1908-1996), Italian road racing cyclist
