= Paco (volcano) =

- Location within Philippines

Highest point
- Elevation: 524 m (1,719 ft)
- Listing: Inactive volcano
- Coordinates: 9°35′36″N 125°31′06″E

Geography
- Location: Mindanao
- Country: Philippines
- Region: Caraga
- Province: Surigao del Norte

Paco is an inactive volcano, 524 metres (1,719 ft) in elevation, located at 9°35.6' North, 125°31.1' East, in the province of Surigao del Norte, region of Caraga, island of Mindanao, the Philippines.
