= Apo–Talomo Mountain range =

Mountain range on Mindanao, Philippines

- Location within Philippines

Highest point
- Peak: Mount Apo
- Elevation: 2,954 m (9,692 ft)
- Coordinates: 6°59′15″N 125°16′15″E

Dimensions
- Length: 70 km (43 mi) north-south
- Width: 26 km (16 mi) east-west
- Area: 1,270 km^{2} (490 mi^{2})

Geography
- Country: Philippines
- Province: Davao del Sur
- City: Davao City

The Apo–Talomo Range (also known as the Mount Talomo or Talomo Mountain Range) is a mountain range in the provinces of Davao del Sur and Cotabato on the island of Mindanao, Philippines. The range contains the country's highest peak, Mount Apo, which rises to an elevation of 2,954 m (9,692 ft). Mount Talomo, standing at 2,674 m (8,773 ft), is one of the top 15 highest mountains in the Philippines.

The range extends approximately 70 kilometers (43 miles) north-south and 26 kilometers (16 miles) east-west, covering an area of around 1,270 square kilometers (490 square miles).

== Peaks ==
List of major peaks within the range by elevation:

- Mount Apo 2,954 m (9,692 ft)
- Mount Talomo 2,674 m (8,773 ft)
- Mount Zion 2,624 m (8,609 ft)
- Crater Peak 1,994 m (6,542 ft)
- Anagon Peak 1,589 m (5,213 ft)

== Biodiversity ==
The Apo–Talomo Mountain Range is a significant biodiversity hotspot. The Mount Apo Natural Park, which encompasses the range, is home to over 800 vascular plant species, many of which are endemic to Mindanao. The area features diverse habitats ranging from lowland dipterocarp forests to mossy montane forests and summit grasslands.

The range is a critical habitat for the critically endangered Philippine eagle (Pithecophaga jefferyi), which nests in the park's old-growth forests. Other notable fauna include the Philippine warty pig, Mindanao brown deer, and various endemic bird species such as the Apo sunbird and the Bagobo babbler.

== Hydrological features ==
The range serves as a vital headwaters catchment area for several major river systems in the region. Mount Talomo provides water for the Panigan and Tamugan Rivers, which are major tributaries of the Davao River system. The Talomo River flows directly into the Davao Gulf. These water sources are essential for the agricultural and domestic needs of Davao City and surrounding municipalities.

== Conservation and culture ==
The range is primarily protected under the Mount Apo Natural Park, established to conserve its unique ecosystems. It is also recognized as an ASEAN Heritage Park. Despite its protected status, the range faces threats from illegal logging, agricultural encroachment, and unregulated tourism.

The Apo–Talomo range is considered sacred ground by various indigenous groups, including the Manobo, Bagobo, Ubo, Jangan, and Tagabawa tribes, who regard Mount Apo as their ancestral home and "grandfather" of all mountains.
