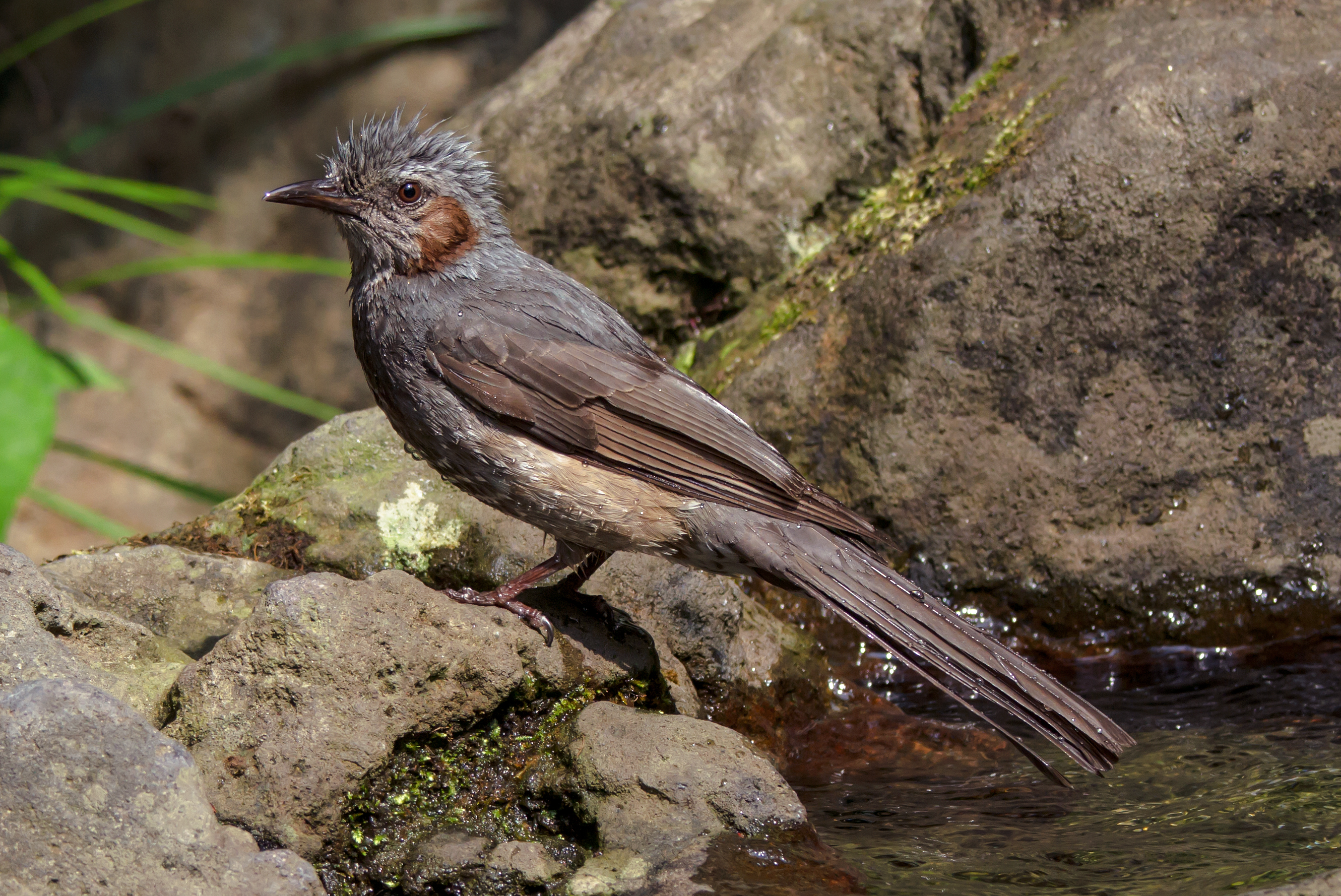
- Osaka

Conservation status
- Least Concern (IUCN 3.1)

Scientific classification
- Kingdom: Animalia
- Phylum: Chordata
- Class: Aves
- Order: Passeriformes
- Family: Pycnonotidae
- Genus: Hypsipetes
- Species: H. amaurotis

Binomial name
- Hypsipetes amaurotis (Temminck, 1830)
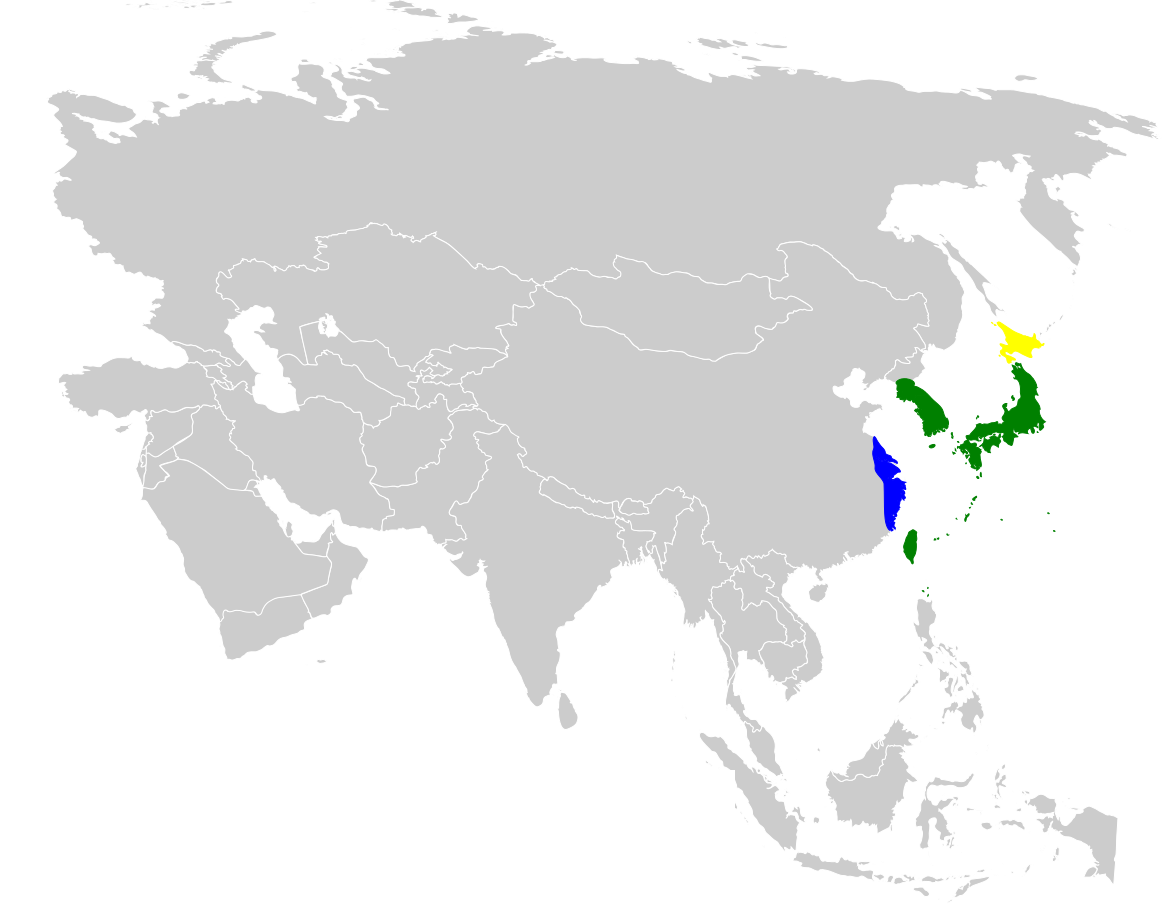
- Distribution map breeding area resident wintering area

Synonyms
- Turdus amaurotis Temminck, 1830; Ixos amaurotis (Temminck, 1830); Microscelis amaurotis

= Brown-eared bulbul =

Species of bird

The brown-eared bulbul (Hypsipetes amaurotis) is a medium-sized bulbul native to eastern Asia. It is extremely common within the northern parts of its range and can be found from southern Sakhalin to the northern Philippines.

Tokyo

== Taxonomy and systematics ==
The brown-eared bulbul was originally described in the genus Turdus. Later, some authorities placed it in the genus Ixos and then the genus Microscelis, before being re-classified to Hypsipetes in 2010. Alternate names for the brown-eared bulbul include the Asian brown-eared bulbul, chestnut-eared bulbul, and Eurasian brown-eared bulbul.

=== Subspecies ===
Twelve subspecies are currently recognized:

- Japanese brown-eared bulbul (H. a. amaurotis) – (Temminck, 1830): Also named the Japanese chestnut-eared bulbul. Found on southern Karafuto, Japan and South Korea
- H. a. matchiae – (Momiyama, 1923): Found on southern Kyushu, Japan
- H. a. ogawae – Hartert, 1907: Found on northern Ryukyu Islands
- H. a. pryeri – Stejneger, 1887: Found on central Ryukyu Islands
- H. a. stejnegeri – Hartert, 1907: Found on southern Ryukyu Islands
- H. a. squamiceps – (Kittlitz, 1830): Originally described as a separate species in the genus Oriolus. Found on the Bonin Islands.
- H. a. magnirostris – Hartert, 1905: Found on the Volcano Islands
- H. a. borodinonis – (Kuroda, 1923): Found on the Borodino Islands
- Taiwan brown-eared bulbul (H. a. nagamichii) – Rand & Deignan, 1960: Also named the Taiwan chestnut-eared bulbul. Found on Taiwan and Orchid Island (Lanyu Island).
- H. a. batanensis – Mearns, 1907: Found on Batan, Ivuhos, Sabtang, and Babuyan (extreme northern Philippines)
- H. a. fugensis – Ogilvie-Grant, 1895: Found on Dalupiri, Calayan and Fuga Island (north of Luzon in northern Philippines)
- H. a. camiguinensis – McGregor, 1907: Found on Camiguin Island (north of Luzon in northern Philippines)

== Description ==
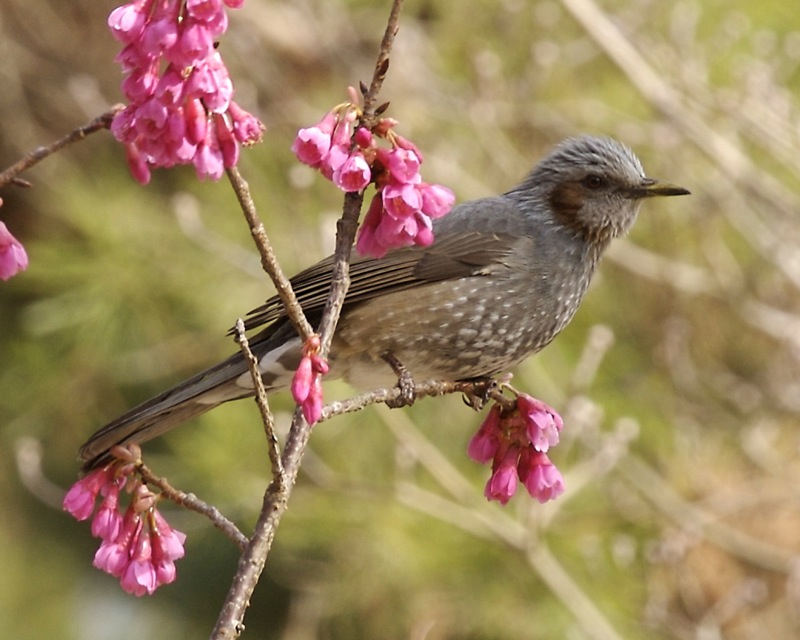
Adult, subspecies squamiceps, Kyoto (Japan)

Reaching a length of about 28 cm (11 in), brown-eared bulbuls are grayish-brown, with brown cheeks (the "brown ears" of the common name) and a long tail. While they prefer forested areas, they readily adapt to urban and rural environments, and their noisy squeaking calls are a familiar sound in most areas of Japan. Flocks of brown-eared bulbuls produce loud "shreep" and "weesp" calls throughout the year. One author described the song of the brown-eared bulbul as "one of the most unattractive noises made by any bird".

== Distribution and habitat ==
The brown-eared bulbul is common in a very large range that includes the Russian Far East (including Sakhalin), northeastern China, the Korean Peninsula, and Japan, south to Taiwan and the Babuyan and Batanes island chains in the north of the Philippines.

Historically, brown-eared bulbuls were migratory birds moving to the southern parts of their range in winter, but they have taken advantage of changes in crops and farming practices in recent decades to overwinter in areas farther north than previously possible. Most brown-eared bulbuls still move south in winter, often forming huge flocks during migration. They are considered agricultural pests in some areas of Japan where they may invade orchards and damage crops such as cabbages, cauliflowers and spinach.

== Behaviour ==
=== Breeding ===
Brown-eared bulbuls typically breed between April and July, and sometimes August. They build cup-shaped nest in the lower branches of trees, in bushes or on man-made structures, 1.5–4.5 metres off the ground. Around five eggs are laid by the female, which then incubates them for 13 to 14 days. Brown-eared bulbuls are frequently parasitized by cuckoos, whose chicks will push bulbul eggs and chicks out of the nest.

=== Feeding ===
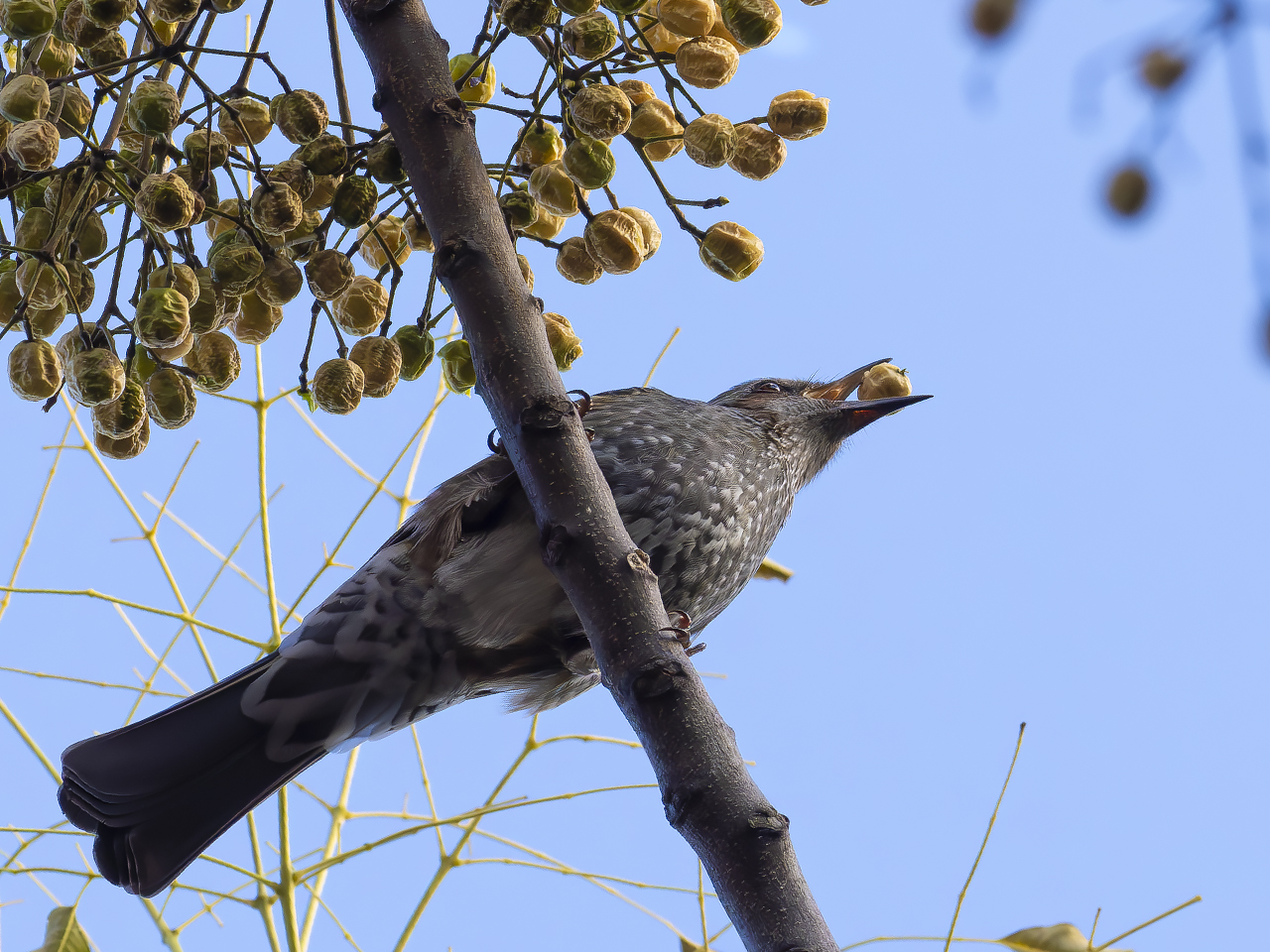
Gumma-ken (Japan)

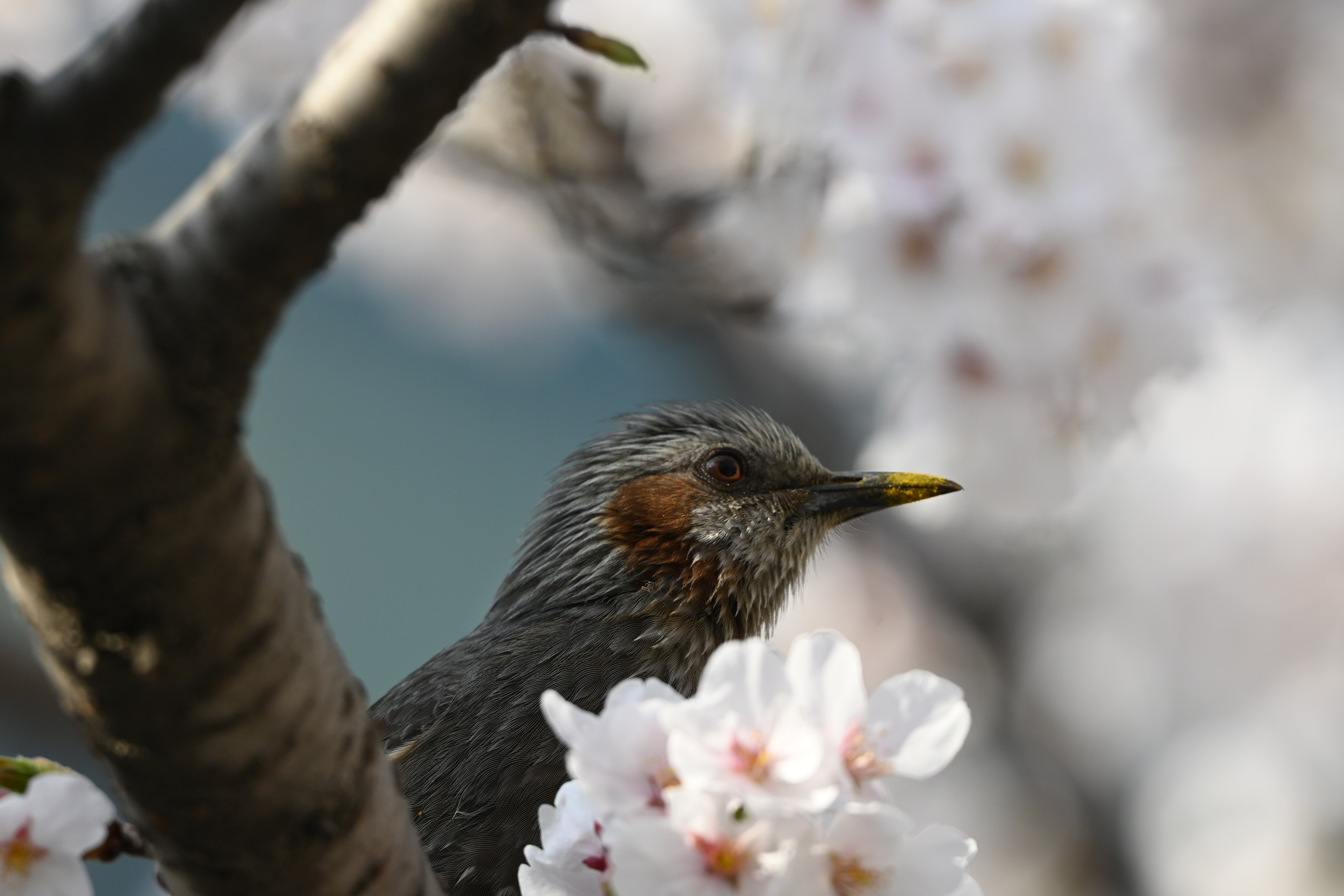
Feeding on cherry blossoms, Seongnam (South Korea)

In summer, brown-eared bulbuls primarily feed on insects, while they mostly take fruits (like berries and citrus) and seeds in the fall and winter. At this time, they also feed on the nectar from Camellia flowers, becoming dusted with yellow pollen in the process. In this way they help to pollinate the flowers at a time of year when there are few insect pollinators around.

== Diseases ==
H. amaurotis is a host for the haemosporidian disease Haemoproteus philippinensis (Haemoproteus (Parahaemoproteus) philippinensis).
