= Calayan =

Calayan may refer to:

- Calayan, Cagayan, municipality in the Philippines
  - Calayan Island, one of the four islands of the municipality
- Calayan rail, a bird endemic to the Philippines
- Manny Calayan, celebrity Filipino cosmetic surgeon
