= Lycodon chrysoprateros =

Conservation status
- Critically Endangered (IUCN 3.1)

Scientific classification
- Kingdom: Animalia
- Phylum: Chordata
- Class: Reptilia
- Order: Squamata
- Suborder: Serpentes
- Family: Colubridae
- Genus: Lycodon
- Species: L. chrysoprateros

Binomial name
- Lycodon chrysoprateros Ota & Ross, 1994

Species of snake

Lycodon chrysoprateros, also known as Ross's wolf snake, is a species of colubrid snake found on the island of Dalupiri in the Philippines.

== Etymology ==
The species name chrysoprateros is derived from the Greek words chrys, which means "gold," and prater which means "trader." The name was chosen by the biologists who described the snake to recognize H.G. Jarecki, the former chairman of the Mocatta Metals Corporation, who supported their work.

== Description ==
The head of Lycodon chrysoprateros is distinct from the neck, and slightly flattened. It has pupils which are nearly circular, and its snout projects further forward than its lower jaw. The body is nearly cylindrical, being more rounded on the back and flattened on the belly. The rostral scale is large and triangular, extending backwards, and visible from above the snake. The dorsal surface of the snake is dark brown, without any patterning, and the ventral surface is ivory-yellow. A holotype for the species had a snout-to-vent length of 51.5 centimeters, and a tail-length of 21.2 centimeters, giving it a total length of 72.7 centimeters. Unlike other related species found in the area, it has no patterning on its back.

== Reproduction ==
Lycodon chrysoprateros is oviparous, or egg-laying.

== Phylogeny ==
L. chrysoprateros is a member of the genus Lycodon, a genus of snakes commonly known as wolf snakes. The genus belongs to the snake family Colubridae, the largest snake family, with member species being found on every continent except Antarctica.

== Habitat and ecology ==
The habitat and ecology of the species are poorly known. The three specimens used to describe the species were captured along a trail in the forest, and the species is known to be terrestrial.

== Distribution ==
The species is definitively known only from Dalupiri Island in the Babuyan island group in the Philippines, where it was first observed in 1990. The known range of the species is thus only 52 square kilometers. The species may have also been observed on the nearby islands of Calayan and Camiguin Norte: however, these are yet to be confirmed. If they are, the known range will expand to 300 square kilometers.

== Conservation ==
L. chrysoprateros is listed as "Critically endangered" in the IUCN Red List, due to the fact that its range is only 52 square kilometres (20 sq mi) on an island that is facing significant habitat decline. Dalupiri Island has a highly fragmented forest which is declining further in size due to ranching activity. The nature of specific threats to the species remain poorly known, due to the species being poorly studied.
