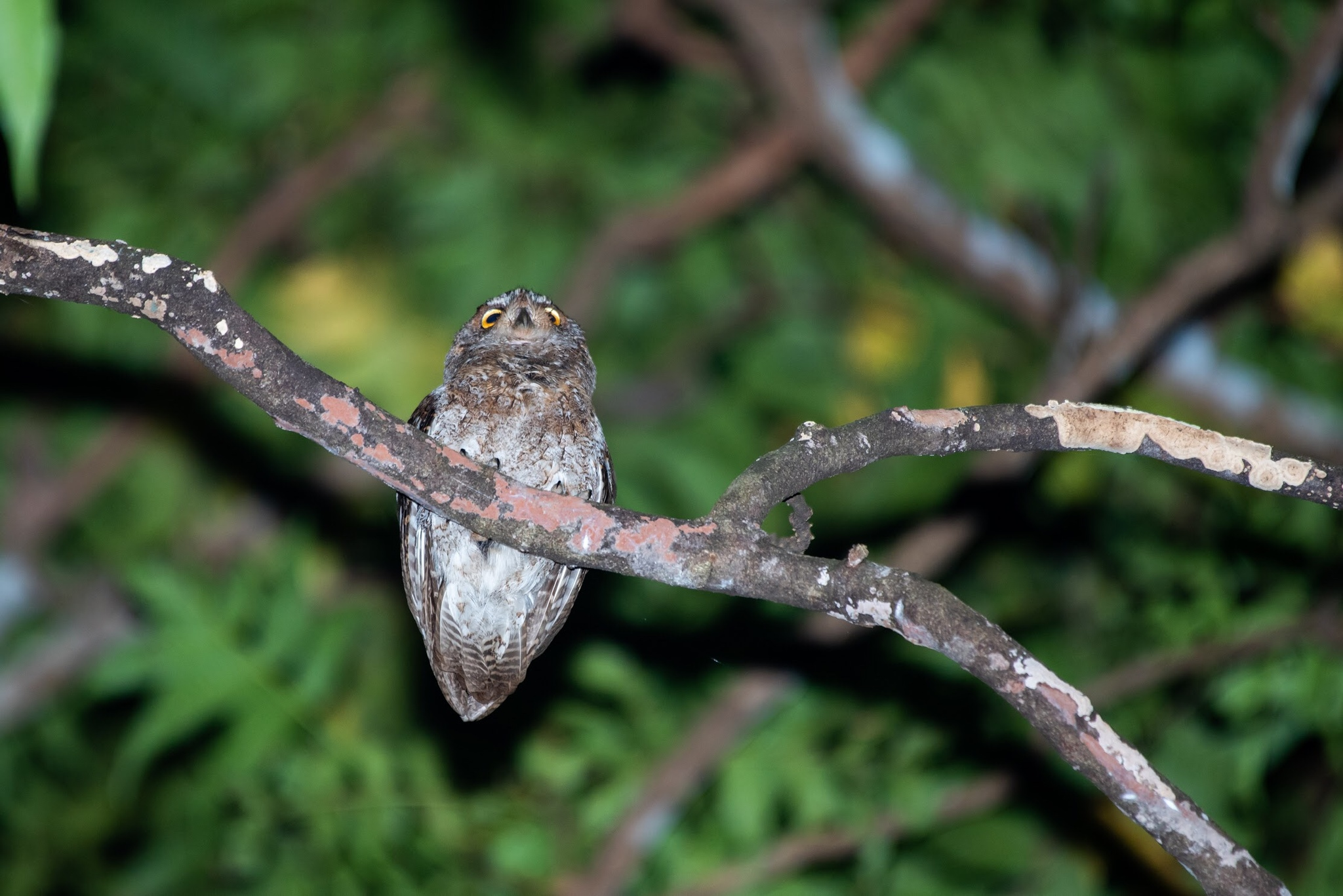

Conservation status
- Near Threatened (IUCN 3.1)
- CITES Appendix II

Scientific classification
- Kingdom: Animalia
- Phylum: Chordata
- Class: Aves
- Order: Strigiformes
- Family: Strigidae
- Genus: Otus
- Species: O. elegans

Binomial name
- Otus elegans (Cassin, 1852)

= Ryūkyū scops owl =

Species of owl

The Ryukyu scops owl (Ryūkyū scops owl) or elegant scops owl (Otus elegans) is a small rufous-brown owl with a brown face disk and a cinnamon facial ruff. The bill is olive-grey and it has yellow eyes.

Otus elegans botelensis is a territorial bird. As their beaks are unable to make holes in the trees, their nests are mainly made in naturally decayed tree holes or holes that have been made by other animals. Occasionally traces of their nests can be found in man-made constructions such as drainage holes or toilets' water tanks. Their staple diet includes katydids, moths, millipedes, and other invertebrates. Occasionally they feed on geckos, lizards or even Japanese white-eye and other small vertebrates.

== Description ==
The Ryukyu scops owl is a small owl with a length of 19 to 22 cm (0.62 to 0.72 ft). It has a wingspan of 60 cm (2.0 ft) and a weight ranging from 100 to 107 g (0.220 to 0.236 lb).

Otus elegans is a dark rufous-brown scops owl. It has short ear-tufts. It is more heavily spotted than the Oriental scops owl and has no pale collar on the neck. The crown is spotted and the mantle has dark streaks and fine barring, with pale eyebrows and a pale chin. The bill is dark grey and the eyes are yellow. Its underparts are finely barred and heavily streaked.

Plumage colouration varies between the northern and southern populations of the Ryukyu scops owl (specifically of subspecies O. e. elegans). The northern clade appear to have darker plumage than the southern one. On Okinawa Island, both clades occur but do not appear to have any plumage difference. Additionally, plumage colouration varies between islands. On Iriomote, individuals tend to have brighter and redder plumage, a result of high levels of pheomelanin for strong bacterial resistance in a bacteria-rich environment; on Tokunoshima, they tend to be browner and duller, which suggests this environment might be unsuitable for owls due to low bacterial resistance. There is currently no evidence that plumage variation have a consistent relationship with environmental factors.

== Habitat and distribution ==
The Ryukyu scops owl is found on the Ryukyu Islands of southern Japan, on Lanyu Island off south-east Taiwan, and on the Batanes and Babuyan Islands off northern Luzon, Philippines, in tropical or subtropical evergreen forest. It is becoming rare due to habitat loss.

It mainly lives on small islands with an area ranging from 1.15 km^{2} (0.44 sq mi) to 1,206 km^{2} (466 sq mi). Okinoshima, lying 490 km (300 mi) away from Nakanoshima, represents the northern limit of its distribution.

The distribution of the Otus elegans botelensis is restricted by the distribution of naturally occurring tree holes. The size of the holes is usually a diameter at breast height (dbh) of more than 38 cm. Different types of trees provide differing quantities of such holes for the O. e. botelensis. Observation had revealed that tree holes are more likely to form in Pometia pinnata compared to other types of tree, therefore, areas with lots of P. pinnata have greater densities of the O. e. botelensis.

== Taxonomy ==
Four subspecies are recognised:

- Otus elegans interpositus Kuroda, Nm, 1923 – Daitō Islands (southern Japan)

Of all four subspecies of Ryukyu scops owl, interpositus is the most at risk due to its very isolated habitat and its vulnerability to natural disasters such as typhoons. Subspecies interpositus seems to have a different song, though no speciation has been decided to this day.

- Otus elegans elegans (Cassin, J, 1852) – Ryukyu Islands (southern Japan)

Genetic studies have identified two distinct genetic clades of the Ryukyu scops owl (subspecies O. e. elegans) within the Ryukyu Archipelago. These populations are geographically separated by the Miyako Strait (also known as Kerama Gap), with the northern and southern clades occupying their respective parts of the archipelago. A maximum genetic divergence of 2.9% between the two clades suggests that the Miyako Strait may have acted as a biogeographical barrier, contributing to their divergence through vicariance approximately 1.5 million years ago. However, the two populations are not currently classified as separate subspecies.

- Otus elegans botelensis Kuroda, Nm, 1928 – Lan yü Island (off southeastern Taiwan) – Lanyu scops owl

This subspecies is found only on Lan yü Island and nests in large old-growth trees, hunting Orthoptera. Much of the open grassland habitat is kept up by the Tao people's traditional 3 to 5 year fallow farming near the forest. The owl's survival is tied to indigenous land use.

- Otus elegans calayensis McGregor, RC, 1904 – Philippines islands in the Batan and Babuyan island groups, including Itbayat, Batan, Sabtang, Calayan, Camiguin Norte

Otus elegans calayensis is the Philippines' only Ryukyu scops owl.

== Behaviour ==
=== Vocalization ===
Male Ryukyu scops owls produce a low-pitched (c 800-1000 hz) song, often described as a double-noted hiccup "uhu". While female song is very similar, it can average a slightly higher pitch. Subspecies calayensis, found in the Philippines, can sound quite different, with a short low hoot followed by a longer, higher-pitched one, resembling "hoot-hoot".

Vocalizations vary geographically across its range. In subspecies O. e. elegans, different vocalizations can be divided into northern and southern groups, with the Kerama Gap as a boundary between them.

From February to April, during the prelaying period, Ryukyu scops owls produce mating calls.

=== Diet ===
Otus elegans feeds primarily on insects, particularly orthopterans such as bush-crickets and crickets. Other recorded prey include stick insects, moths, cicadas, centipedes, spiders, geckos, and other small lizards. It will also occasionally feed on small birds. Ryukyu scops owl predominantly captures small, arboreal prey, foraging mainly in trees and vegetation.

=== Reproduction ===
The Ryukyu scops owl is monogamous, and pair bonds usually last until one of the pair dies. Pairs hold their territories year-round and tend to reuse the same nest sites, which are natural tree cavities. Females lay one to four eggs between mid-March and mid-May. Incubation and the nestling period each last about one month. Males bring food to their mates until the middle of the nestling period, after which both parents share feeding duties. Young owls between 12 and 24 months of age tend to breed later in the season than adults. Breeding season occurs from March to August.
