= Didicas Volcano =

Active volcanic island in the province of Cagayan in northern Philippines

- Location within Luzon Location within Philippines

Highest point
- Elevation: 228 m (748 ft)
- Prominence: 228 m (748 ft)
- Listing: Active volcanoes in the Philippines
- Coordinates: 19°4.6′N 122°12.1′E

Geography
- Country: Philippines
- Region: Cagayan Valley
- Province: Cagayan

Geology
- Mountain type: Volcanic island
- Volcanic arc: Luzon Volcanic Arc
- Last eruption: January 1978

Didicas Volcano is an active volcanic island in the province of Cagayan in northern Philippines. The island, which was a submarine volcano and re-emerged from the sea in 1952, lies 22 kilometres (14 mi) NE of Camiguin Island, one of the Babuyan Islands in Luzon Strait. Before 1952, the volcano first breached the ocean surface in 1857.

== Physical features ==
Didicas is topped with a lava dome with an elevation of 228 metres (748 ft) and a base diameter of 1,200 metres (3,900 ft) at sea level. It is at the northern end of the Luzon Volcanic Arc, and like all the volcanoes in the Philippines, is part of the Pacific ring of fire.

== Eruption history ==
There have been six historical eruptions recorded from the volcano since the 18th century.

- 1773: The first recorded submarine eruption from the volcano, on what was known as Didicas reefs of the Farallones.
- 1856 September or October: The first activity started as a column of "smoke" in between the two rocks well known to the locals, but no earthquakes were felt.
- 1857: The volcano erupted violently, attended by earthquakes, then broke the surface of the sea. From then to 1860, the volcano was constantly active and in four years had reached a height of 700 feet (210 m). The island was later washed out by the waves and disappeared beneath the sea.
- 1900: An eruption left three rock masses up to 82 feet (25 m) high.
- 1952: The volcano broke the ocean's surface again during an eruption that started around March 16.
- 1953: The activities subsided. The resulting island is 1.5 miles (2.4 km) wide with an elevation of 240 metres (800 ft).
- 1969: First known fatalities from the volcano: three fishermen were killed while fishing near the volcano. The activity, which started on March 21, came from a new crater on the northern side of the island. Air reconnaissance over the volcano reported bubbling mud on the 20 m (66 ft) wide bottom of the crater. Activity on the volcano waned in June.
- 1978 January 6 to 9: The last eruption of Didicas to date. The mild eruption blanketed the island with volcanic ash.

== See also ==
- List of volcanoes in the Philippines
  - List of active volcanoes in the Philippines
  - List of potentially active volcanoes in the Philippines
  - List of inactive volcanoes in the Philippines
- Philippine Institute of Volcanology and Seismology
