= Barit =

Island in Aparri, Cagayan, Philippines

- Location within Philippines

Geography
- Coordinates: 18°52′10″N 121°15′23″E
- Archipelago: Babuyan Islands
- Adjacent to: Babuyan Channel
- Area: 700 ha (1,700 acres)

Administration
- Philippines
- Region: Cagayan Valley
- Province: Cagayan
- Municipality: Aparri
- Barangay: Fuga Island

Additional information

Barit (historically Bari) is a small, wooded, privately owned island in northern Cagayan, Philippines. It is under the jurisdiction of Barangay Fuga Island in the municipality of Aparri.

== Location and geography ==
Barit Island is north of Luzon Island in the Luzon Strait. Part of the Babuyan Islands, Barit is 0.75 miles (1.21 km) west of nearby Fuga Island. Mabag Island is only 0.5 miles (0.80 km) from Barit. There is a small airstrip on Barit. Barit was owned by Chinese-Filipino businessman Tan Yu, who purchased the island in 1990. Barit is currently administered by Barit Island Holdings, a subsidiary of Yu's Asiaworld Internationale.

== See also ==
- List of islands in the Philippines
