= Dalupiri Island (Cagayan) =

Island in the Philippines and part of the Babuyan Islands

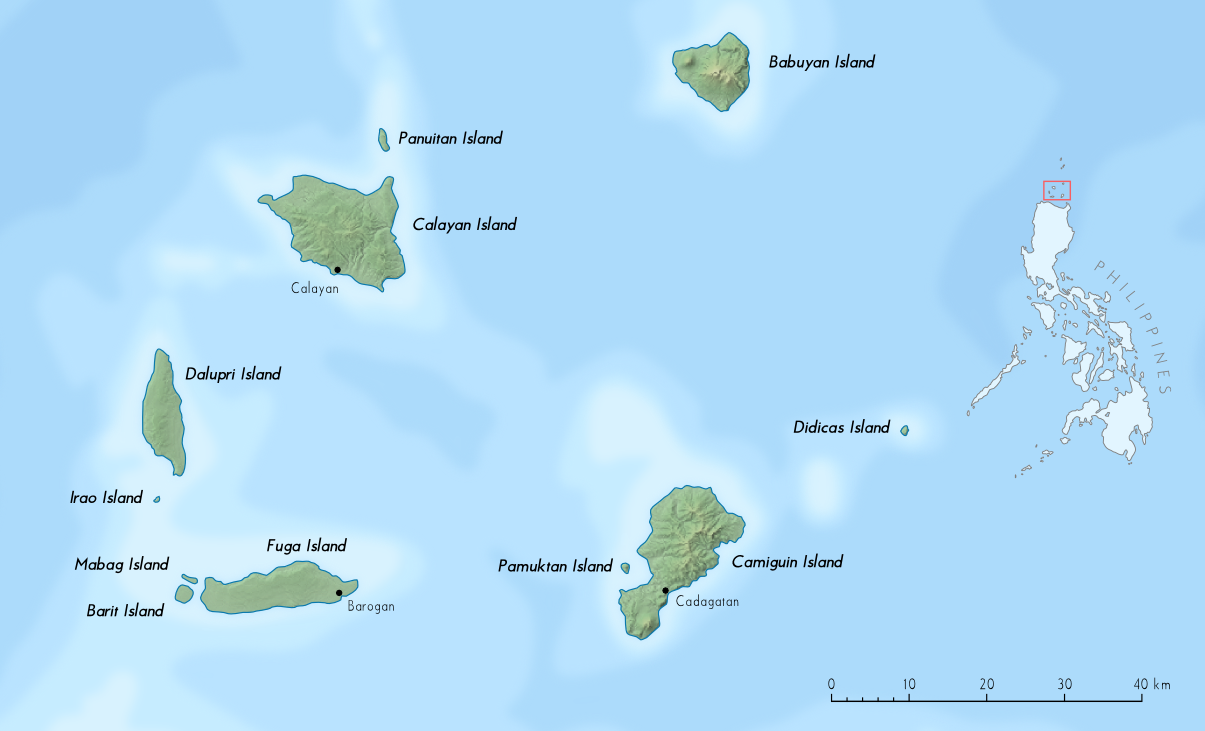
- Dalupiri is the westernmost island of the Babuyan archipelago

- Location within Philippines

Geography
- Coordinates: 19°5′N 121°14′E
- Archipelago: Babuyan Islands
- Adjacent to: Babuyan Channel
- Area: 50 km^{2} (19 sq mi)
- Length: 24 km (14.9 mi)
- Width: 7 km (4.3 mi)
- Highest elevation: 297 m (974 ft)
- Highest point: Mount Dalupiri

Administration
- Philippines
- Region: Cagayan Valley
- Province: Cagayan
- Municipality: Calayan
- Barangay: Dalupiri

Demographics
- Population: 621 (2020)
- Pop. density: 12.4/km^{2} (32.1/sq mi)

Additional information

Dalupiri Island is an island in the Babuyan Islands in Luzon Strait north of Luzon Island in the Philippines. The whole island makes up the barangay of Dalupiri, which is part of the municipality of Calayan in Cagayan province, which had 621 inhabitants in 2020, up from 611 in 2010.

The island can reached by boat from the Port of Aparri.

== Geography ==
Dalupiri Island lies about 45 km (28 mi) north of Luzon and about 15 km (9.3 mi) north of Fuga Island. The island has an elongated elliptical shape orientated along a north–south axis, the island has a length of about 18 km (11 mi), with a width of about 7 km (4.3 mi) at its widest point. The topography of the island is characterized by a flat hilly landscape, in the center of the island, the terrain rises to 297 metres (974 ft) above sea level. The island has an area of 166 square kilometres (64 sq mi). The longest river of the island is the Manolong River, about 2.5 km long.

The vegetation of the island consists partly of dense, tropical vegetation, and partly agricultural land. The largest animals on the island are the Carabao and horses. A small population of the Philippine crocodile (Crocodylus mindorensis) is also native to the island. Of the avifauna (birds) present on the island, the nankeen night heron (Nycticorax caledonicus) and the Zebra Ralle (Gallirallus torquatus) both are known to breed on the island.

Another island named Dalupiri is located in the Samar Sea, in the province of Northern Samar.
