= Calayan Island =

Island in the Philippines

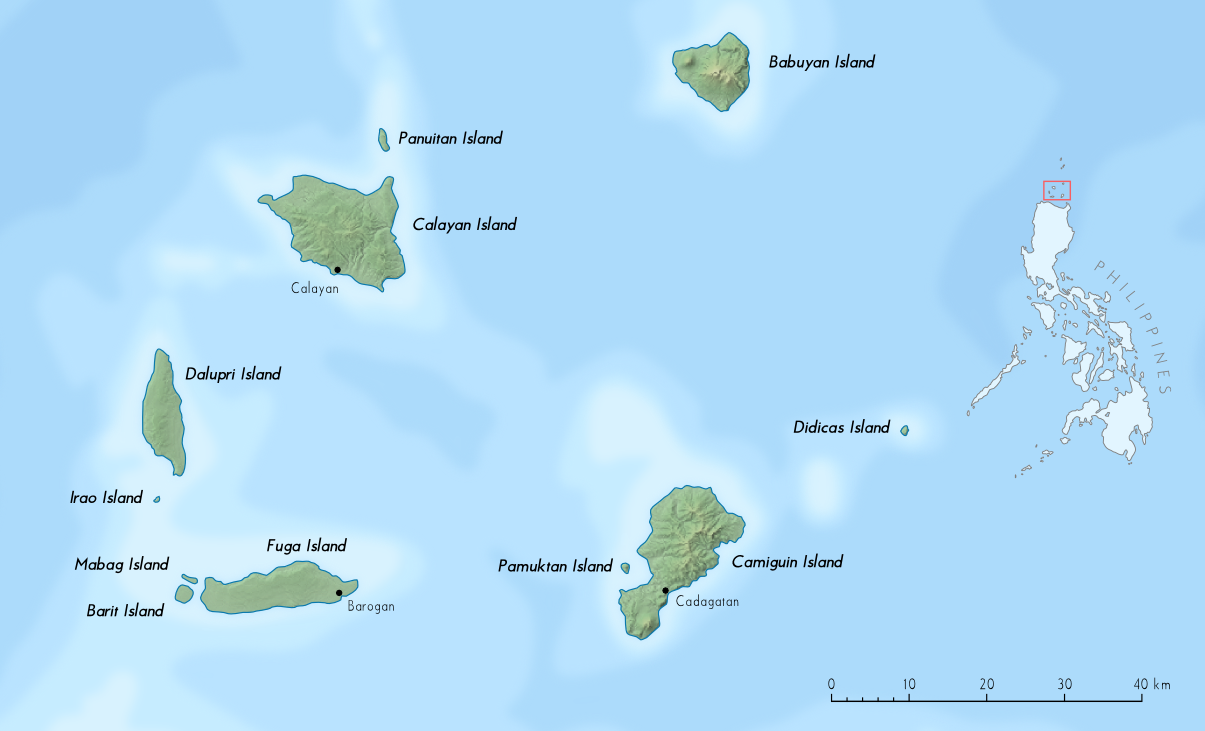

- Location within Philippines

Geography
- Coordinates: 19°19′37″N 121°27′57″E
- Archipelago: Babuyan Islands
- Adjacent to: Balintang Channel; Luzon Strait
- Area: 196 km^{2} (76 sq mi)
- Highest elevation: 499 m (1637 ft)
- Highest point: Mount Calayan

Administration
- Philippines
- Region: Cagayan Valley
- Province: Cagayan
- Municipality: Calayan
- Barangays: Cabudadan, Dadao, Dibay, Dilam, Magsidel, Poblacion, Centro II

Demographics
- Population: 9,648 (2020)
- Pop. density: 49.2/km^{2} (127.4/sq mi)

Additional information

Calayan Island is located about 24 miles (21 nmi; 39 km) west-southwest of Babuyan Island off the north coast of the Philippines and belongs to the Babuyan Islands group in the Luzon Strait. The island is hemmed between Aparri and Batanes islands and it is larger than the Fuga Island, which is 25 miles (40 km) away. Calayan is home to the Calayan rail, a flightless bird identified as a separate species in 2004 and endemic to Calayan Island. The island is part of the Municipality of Calayan.

== History ==
The name of the island came from the Ibanag language, meaning "where laya (ginger) is abounded". A mission headquarters was established on Calayan Island in 1722. During the Spanish colonial administration regime, the administrators were Don Licerio Duerme in 1896, Don Pedro Abad in 1897, and Don Angel Escalante during 1898–1902.

Administratively, the Calayan island was part of the Batanes group of islands. From 1902, Calayan was brought under Cagayan Province. However, this change of administrative control resulted in the isolation of the islanders as transport communications were lacking. In 1916, Fray Andres Sanchez and Fray Geronimo Morer, Dominican Fathers, visited this island and gave the island its name. It was only in 1954 that the Governor of Cagayan, Jose P. Carag, came to Calayan. The next visit by a governor was only in 1981, by Justiniano P. Cortez, when a mobile government was organized to improve the health conditions of the people and to distribute medicine and food items such as rice, canned goods, and seeds. A repeat of this mission occurred in 1982.

In 1940, during World War II, American Forces, who came by the USS Princeton, occupied the island. This was welcomed by the people of Calayan as it ushered prosperity to the island as well as the provision of medicine, clothing and other items of utility. Schools were established by the American forces and they also functioned as teachers with English as the medium of instruction. They also introduced adult education programmes. In return, the Calayanos offered gifts to the soldiers such as ancient jars, sea shells and handicrafts. On 8 December 1941, the Calayan group of islands became occupied by Japanese Imperial Forces. During the early liberation period in 1944, the combined Filipino and American Forces seized the Japanese garrison, and moved the Japanese prisoners to concentration camps in Luzon.

The rocky northern coast line of the Calayan Island was the scene of a disaster when the warship Datu Kalantiaw, which had served during World War II and subsequently under the Philippine flag, was hit by Typhoon Clara. The ship ran aground on 21 September 1981. Rescue and recovery operations were launched by the ammunition ship USS Mount Hood together with the Philippine Navy units "in a most adverse weather environment," and could recover only 49 bodies of the 79 who perished (presumably the other 30 bodies were not recovered) which were taken to Manila to be handed over to the next of kin of the dead.

== Geography ==
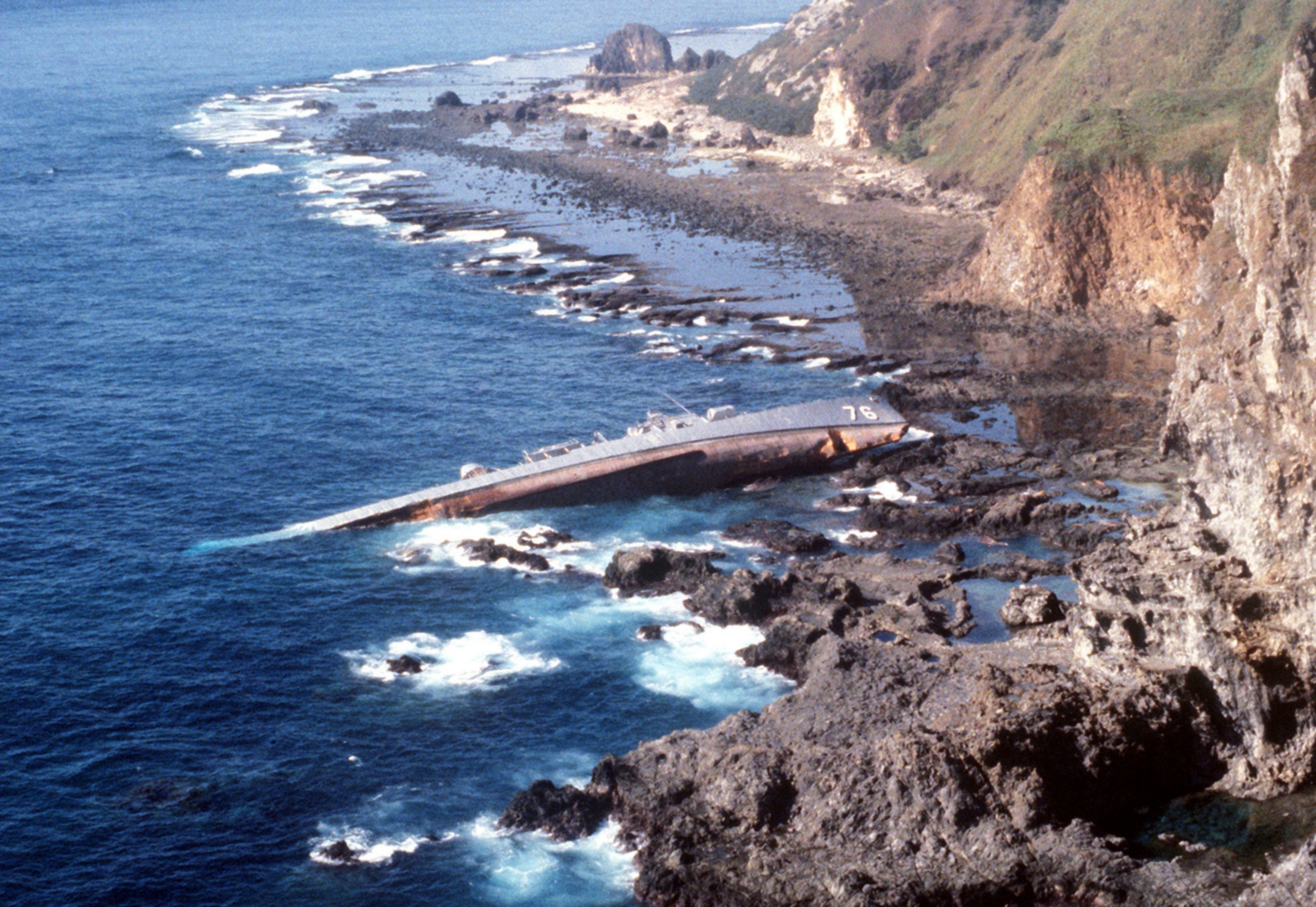
Rocky northern shore of Calayan Island with the capsized Philippine frigate during the typhoon Clara (September 1981)

The land area of the island is 196 square kilometres (76 sq mi). It has a rough rectangular shape with rolling hills, spread over a length of 23 kilometres (14 mi). The island consists mainly of mountainous and uneven land, with the highest land in the centre, with low gaps in places. The hill ridge runs through the middle of the island and is heavily forested. The Mt. Calayan which was once an active volcano is the highest peak here. The island is of volcanic origin and has rich deposits of perlite, a greyish white rock which is called as the "wonder rock". There are rocky shores and white sand beaches. Four rivers drain the island. Coral limestones are seen at both the higher and lower levels of the island. The eastern part of the island has basaltic columns, which are seen in a good state of preservation.

The populated areas on the island are Calayan town (Centro) and Magsidel on the south coast. Calayan town is the largest among the Babuyan Island group and it is a small fishing center. The port of Calayan is used for shipping goats, hogs, cattle and timber.

There are three floodplains where rice is cultivated. Tidal coral flats that protect the sandy beaches between the settlements of Dilam and Dibay are also a distinct feature. The present access is by outrigger boats locally called lampitaw, which takes the islanders from Calayan to the port of Aparri and Claveria on the west coast of the Cagayan Province where an airport to operate small aircraft is also under construction.

=== Climate ===
Weather conditions are generally wet with heavy rainfall occurring during November and December. The cold winds are the northerly and north-easterly winds. The island is also affected by typhoons. Calayan Island publishes tide tables and solunar tables, daily forecasts for high tides and low tides, other fishing-related data such as the lunar phase, tidal coefficient, sun and moon rising and setting times, hours of maximum fish activity and weather conditions. This data is also useful for all fishing operations in the Calayan Island, apart from navigation of other commercial and transport vessels.

Climate data for Calayan, Cagayan (1981–2011, extremes 1949–2012)
| Month | Jan | Feb | Mar | Apr | May | Jun | Jul | Aug | Sep | Oct | Nov | Dec | Year |
|---|---|---|---|---|---|---|---|---|---|---|---|---|---|
| Record high °C (°F) | 34.9 (94.8) | 35.0 (95.0) | 35.6 (96.1) | 35.8 (96.4) | 37.2 (99.0) | 37.0 (98.6) | 37.8 (100.0) | 37.1 (98.8) | 35.7 (96.3) | 35.0 (95.0) | 34.3 (93.7) | 33.3 (91.9) | 37.8 (100.0) |
| Mean daily maximum °C (°F) | 26.5 (79.7) | 27.1 (80.8) | 28.9 (84.0) | 31.1 (88.0) | 32.4 (90.3) | 32.6 (90.7) | 32.3 (90.1) | 31.7 (89.1) | 31.2 (88.2) | 30.2 (86.4) | 28.7 (83.7) | 26.8 (80.2) | 30.0 (86.0) |
| Daily mean °C (°F) | 23.8 (74.8) | 24.2 (75.6) | 25.6 (78.1) | 27.5 (81.5) | 28.7 (83.7) | 29.1 (84.4) | 28.9 (84.0) | 28.5 (83.3) | 28.0 (82.4) | 27.3 (81.1) | 26.2 (79.2) | 24.2 (75.6) | 26.8 (80.2) |
| Mean daily minimum °C (°F) | 21.2 (70.2) | 21.2 (70.2) | 22.3 (72.1) | 23.8 (74.8) | 25.1 (77.2) | 25.6 (78.1) | 25.5 (77.9) | 25.3 (77.5) | 24.7 (76.5) | 24.3 (75.7) | 23.6 (74.5) | 21.7 (71.1) | 23.7 (74.7) |
| Record low °C (°F) | 13.9 (57.0) | 15.3 (59.5) | 15.8 (60.4) | 17.2 (63.0) | 19.0 (66.2) | 19.1 (66.4) | 19.8 (67.6) | 21.6 (70.9) | 20.2 (68.4) | 17.4 (63.3) | 15.6 (60.1) | 14.8 (58.6) | 13.9 (57.0) |
| Average rainfall mm (inches) | 170.6 (6.72) | 126.2 (4.97) | 49.4 (1.94) | 58.0 (2.28) | 159.2 (6.27) | 170.9 (6.73) | 209.1 (8.23) | 228.4 (8.99) | 318.5 (12.54) | 375.4 (14.78) | 335.1 (13.19) | 219.5 (8.64) | 2,420.3 (95.29) |
| Average rainy days (≥ 0.1 mm) | 17 | 11 | 7 | 5 | 8 | 8 | 11 | 15 | 16 | 18 | 18 | 18 | 152 |
| Average relative humidity (%) | 85 | 86 | 84 | 83 | 83 | 84 | 84 | 86 | 85 | 85 | 86 | 86 | 85 |
Source: PAGASA

== Flora ==
Thick forest is found in the hill ridge that is in the center of the island (elevation 499 metres (1,637 ft)). The forest cover is low land vegetation of primary and regenerated low land forests which are also seen around the exposed coral limestones. This forest has tall “cogon” grass, apart from many species of timber trees along the east coastline and at the north-western tip of the island. Wild guavas are in abundance. Banana is also cultivated though of an inferior variety. Coconut trees are seen in small patches. Other vegetables and crops grown are tobacco, corn, rice and camotes, in the intermediate patches of land. Among the commercial crops, cotton is also grown here. The beach front, above the high wave zone, is covered with butun (a Tugalo language name) trees where hawks are seen.

== Fauna ==
Endemic gecko are found in rocky outcrops, in caves, forests and on tree trunks in the island. Pigs and carabaos (water buffaloes) are seen in the wild.

=== Avifauna ===
The flightless Calayan rail (Gallirallus calayanensis) is restricted to Calayan island under the Babuyan islands group and listed as vulnerable. It was first discovered by scientists in 2004. Malaysian plover is also reported from the sandy beaches here and it is under near threatened category. In 1903, the bird species identified here were 95 of which the birds of the family of Philippines formed a part. The other species were identified, as of the Asiatic genera, such as Hypsipetes and sphenocereus, which form the distinct fauna of the island; the specific species noted were Macropygia, otus, Eudynamys, and Hylorpe. Of the Luzon group, only Cnnyria whitchiadi and Zosterups meyeni were found on the island. There were many migrant species also on the island which were not specifically identified.

According to a field survey carried out in 2004, the newly sighted bird on the island was the Calayan rail Gallirallus calayanensis. Apart from this, the other species recorded during the field visit were:

- white-browed crake (Porzana cinerea)
- Bukidnon woodcock (Scolopax bukidnonensis)
- Taiwan green pigeon (Treron formosae filipina)
- Philippine cuckoo dove
- Macropygia amboinensis or Macropygia tenuirostris
- Asian koel (Eudynamys scolopacea)
- Philippine coucal (Centropus viridis)
- swallow Hirundo rustica
- swallow Hirundo daurica
- swallow Hirundo striolata
- grey heron (Ardea cinerea)
- great egret (Casmerodius albus)
- little egret (Egretta garzetta)
- osprey (Pandion haliaetus)
- grey-faced buzzard (Butastur indicus)
- buff-banded rail (Gallirallus philippensis)
- barred rail (Gallirallus torquatus)
- white-breasted waterhen (Amaurornis phoenicurus)
- greater painted-snipe (Rostratula benghalensis)
- Kentish plover (Charadrius alexandrines)
- greater sand plover (Charadrius leschenaultia)
- Eurasian whimbrel (Numenius phaeopus)
- common greenshank (Tringa nebularia)
- grey-tailed tattler (Heteroscelus brevipes)
- ruddy turnstone (Arenaria interpres)
- spotted dove (Spilopelia chinensis)
- fork-tailed swift (Apus pacificus kanoi)
- house swift (Apus affinis)
- collared kingfisher (Todiramphus chloris)
- Pacific swallow (Hirundo tahitica)
- elegant tit (Parus elegans)
- orange-flanked bush robin (Tarsiger cyanurus)
- Asian glossy starling (Aplonis panayensis)
- crested myna (Acridotheres cristatellus)
- pygmy flowerpecker (Dicaeum pygmaeum)
- lowland white-eye (Zosterops meyeni)
- Eurasian tree sparrow (Passer montanus)

== Tourism ==
The Sibang Cove is known for the many ancient burial grounds, and many artifacts unearthed here are in the National Museum. The municipal administration of the island is developing the cove as an ecotourism destination. As the area is also one of the breeding grounds of the humpback whales, this aspect is also intended to be highlighted for whale watching by tourists.
