= Maybag Island =

Island in the Philippines

Native name: Mabaag Island

Geography
- Coordinates: 18°52′56″N 121°15′38″E
- Highest elevation: 6 m (20 ft)

Additional information

Maybag Island (also Mabaag Island or Mabog Island) is an island in the municipality of Aparri, Philippines. It is one of the islands of the Babuyan Island group, It is 6 metres above sea level.
