= Dalupiri Island =

Dalupiri Island may refer to any of the following islands in the Philippines:

- Dalupiri Island (Samar) in Northern Samar province
- Dalupiri Island (Cagayan) in Cagayan province, and part of the Babuyan Islands
