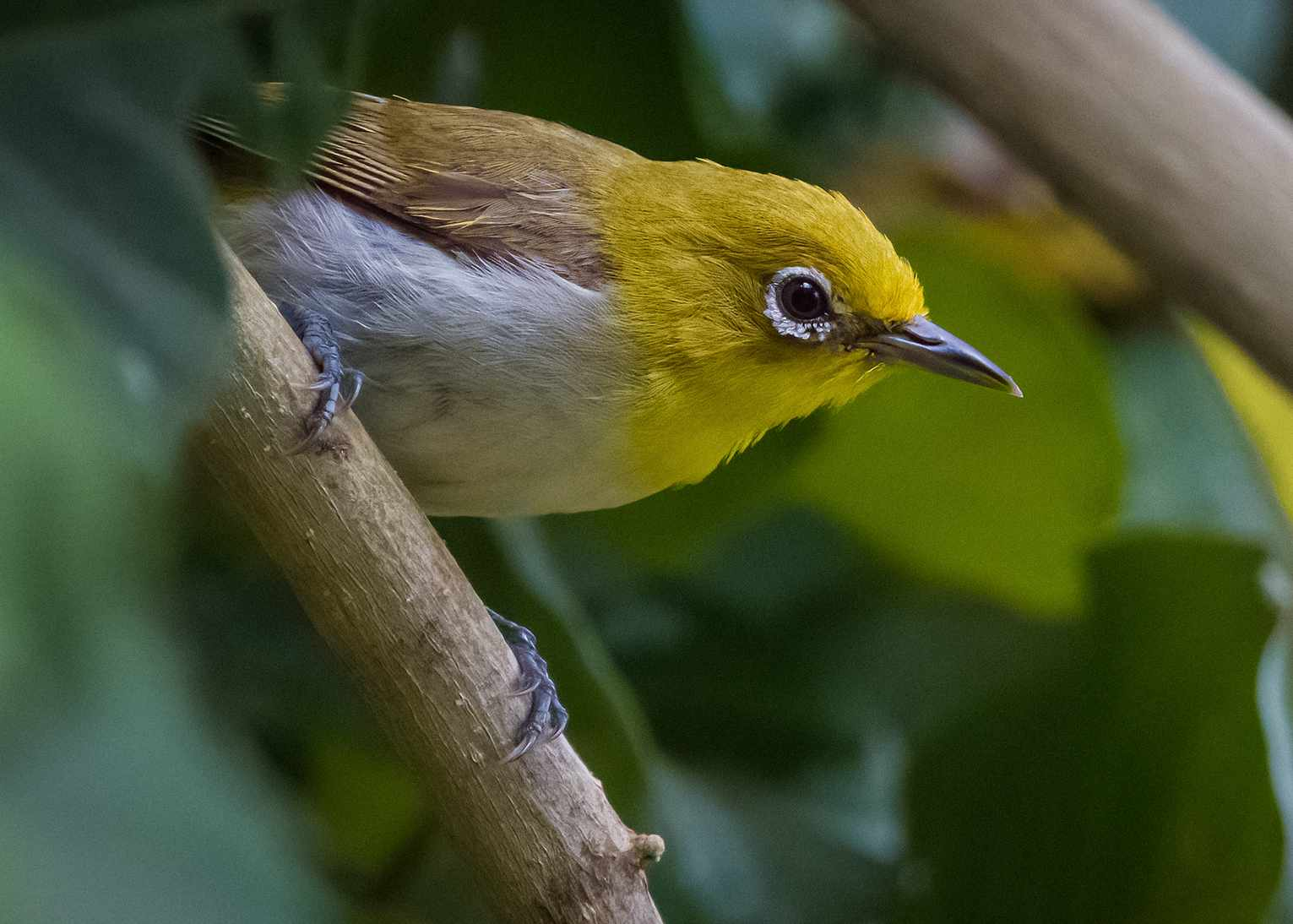

Conservation status
- Least Concern (IUCN 3.1)

Scientific classification
- Kingdom: Animalia
- Phylum: Chordata
- Class: Aves
- Order: Passeriformes
- Family: Zosteropidae
- Genus: Zosterops
- Species: Z. meyeni

Binomial name
- Zosterops meyeni Bonaparte, 1850

= Lowland white-eye =

Species of bird

The lowland white-eye (Zosterops meyeni) is a species of bird in the family Zosteropidae. It is near endemic to the northern part of the Philippines but is also found on the Taiwanese islands of Lüdao and Lanyu. Its natural habitat is tropical moist lowland forest, second growth and gardens.

== Description and taxonomy ==
=== Subspecies ===
Two subspecies are recognized:

- Z. m.meyeni Bonaparte, CL, 1850 – Found on Calayan, Luzon, Lubang, Verde, Mindoro, Caluya, Marinduque and Banton
- Z. m. batanis McGregor, RC, 1907 – Found on Lanyu and Lüdao and Batan

== Ecology and behavior ==
Forages in the understory and often joins mixed-species flocks with other small birds. Breeding season believed to be April to August. Nest is a typical white-eye nest, a few meters above on a small tree. Clutch size 3-4.

== Habitat and conservation status ==
Has a wide range of habitats that include clearings, fishponds, rivers, second growth scrubland, and forest edge. Typically found below 1,000 meters above sea level.

The IUCN has assessed this species as least-concern. This species is common all throughout and has well adapted and even benefited fromohuman modified habitats. While the Philippines has faced massive deforestation, this species adaptability has allowed it to survive and even thrive better than most Philippine birds.
