= Fuga Island =

Island and barangay in the Philippines

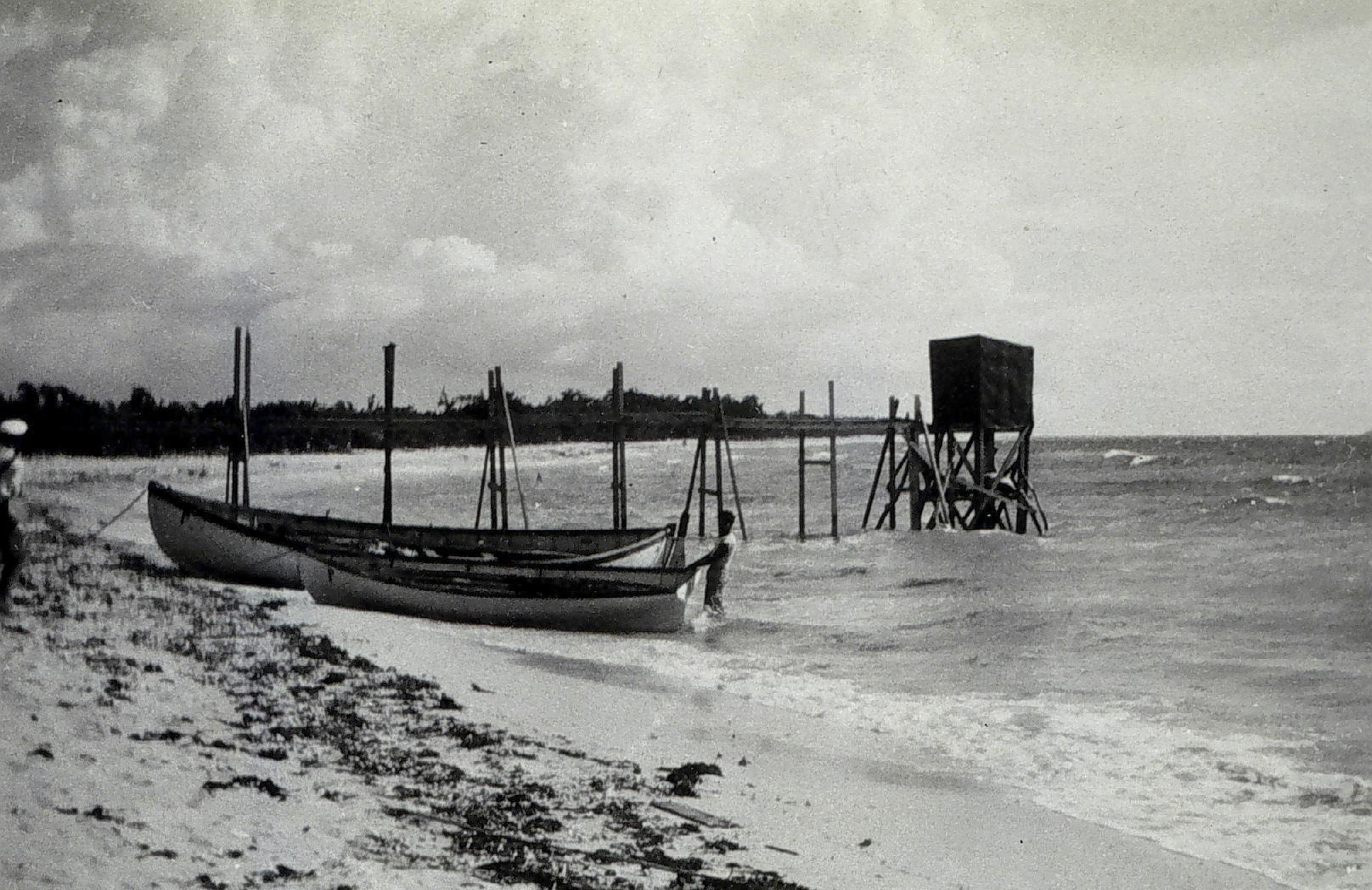
- Fuga Island tide gauge in 1927

- Location within Philippines

Geography
- Coordinates: 18°52′21″N 121°22′44″E
- Archipelago: Babuyan Islands
- Adjacent to: Babuyan Channel
- Area: 70 km^{2} (27 sq mi)
- Highest elevation: 191 m (627 ft)
- Highest point: Mount Nanguringan

Administration
- Philippines
- Region: Cagayan Valley
- Province: Cagayan
- Municipality: Aparri

Demographics
- Population: 1,939 (2020)
- Pop. density: 27.7/km^{2} (71.7/sq mi)

Additional information

Fuga Island is an island and barangay located north of Luzon and is part of the Babuyan Islands, which is the second-northernmost island group of the Philippines. Barangay Fuga Island is one of the 42 barangays under the jurisdiction of the municipality of Aparri in the province of Cagayan.

== Geography ==
Fuga has an area of 70 square kilometres (27 sq mi) and a population of 2,015 people. The principal settlement is Naguilian (Musa) village on the southern coast. The highest peak is Mount Nanguringan in the northeast, with an elevation of 191 metres (627 ft).

Along with the neighbouring islets of Barit (7 square kilometres (2.7 sq mi)) and Mabaag, it constitutes one of 42 barangays of the municipality of Aparri, Cagayan. It is the only one of the Babuyan Islands under the jurisdiction of a mainland municipality, whereas all other islands form the municipality of Calayan.

== History ==
Presently, Fuga Island is owned by Fuga Island Holdings. It was formerly owned by the Dominican Order under the encomienda system during the Spanish Period eventually returned to the Filipinos after the signing of 1898 Treaty of Paris. The first land title was issued in 1908 under Original Certificate Title number two, and the Insular Government of the Philippine Islands designated the island and surrounding ports an economic zone as part of the Cagayan Special Economic Zone (CEZA) and Freeport under Republic Act No. 7922.

=== Archaeology ===
From January 31, 1978 to February 22, 1978, Bryan E. Snow and Richard Shutler, Jr. conducted an archaeological excavation on Fuga Moro Island. Earthenware, pottery, porcelains, and stoneware were found during the excavation.

=== Military presence ===
On August 7, 2020, the Northern Luzon Command established a Marine detachment on the island. It also plans to build a defense facilities on the island, which will include a sheltered pier, a naval station, and a littoral monitoring on 20-hectare detachment.

== See also ==
- List of islands of the Philippines
