= Calayan, Cagayan =

Municipality in Cagayan, Philippines

Calayan
- Municipality
- Municipality of Calayan
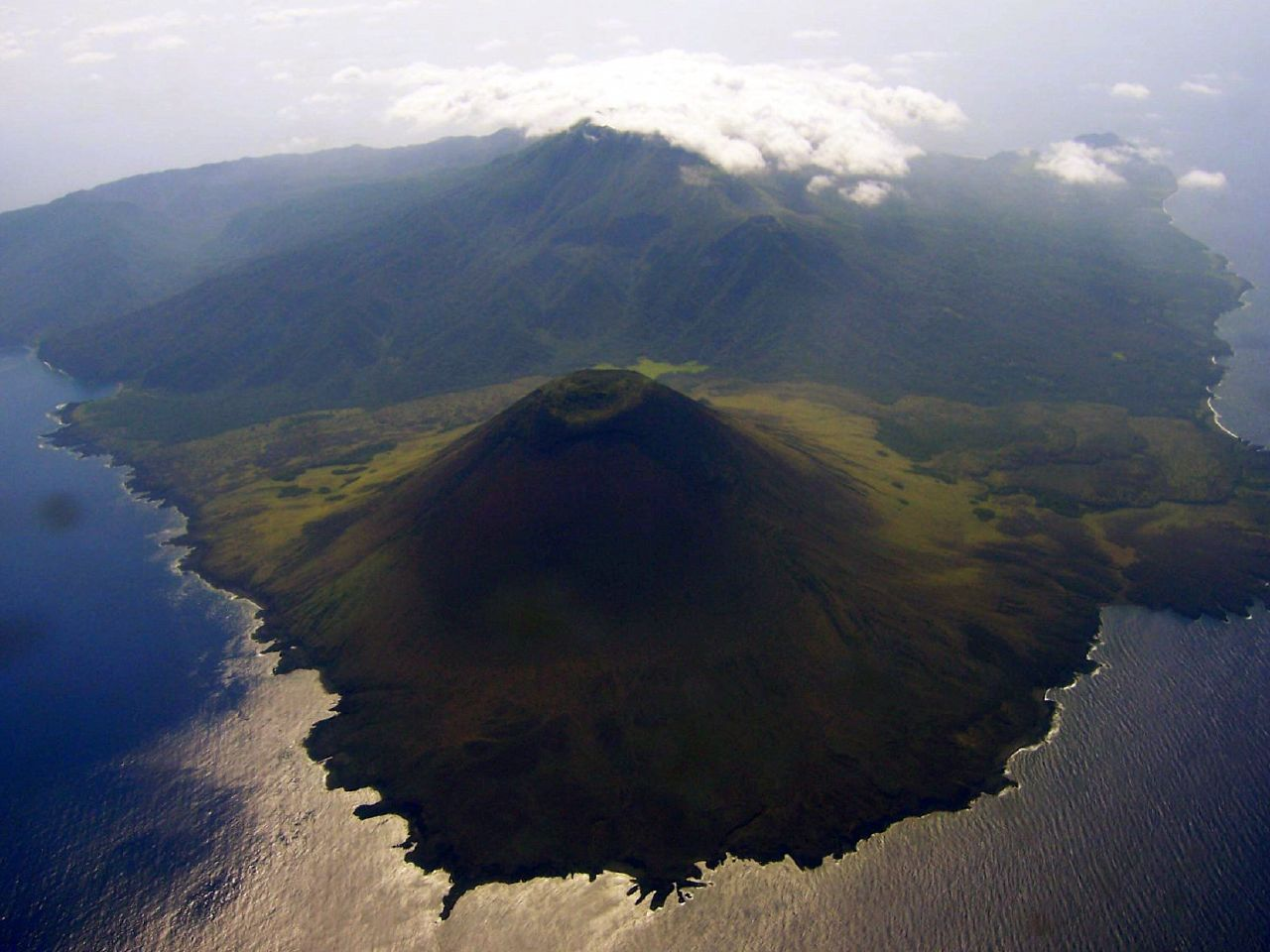
- Smith Volcano on Babuyan Island

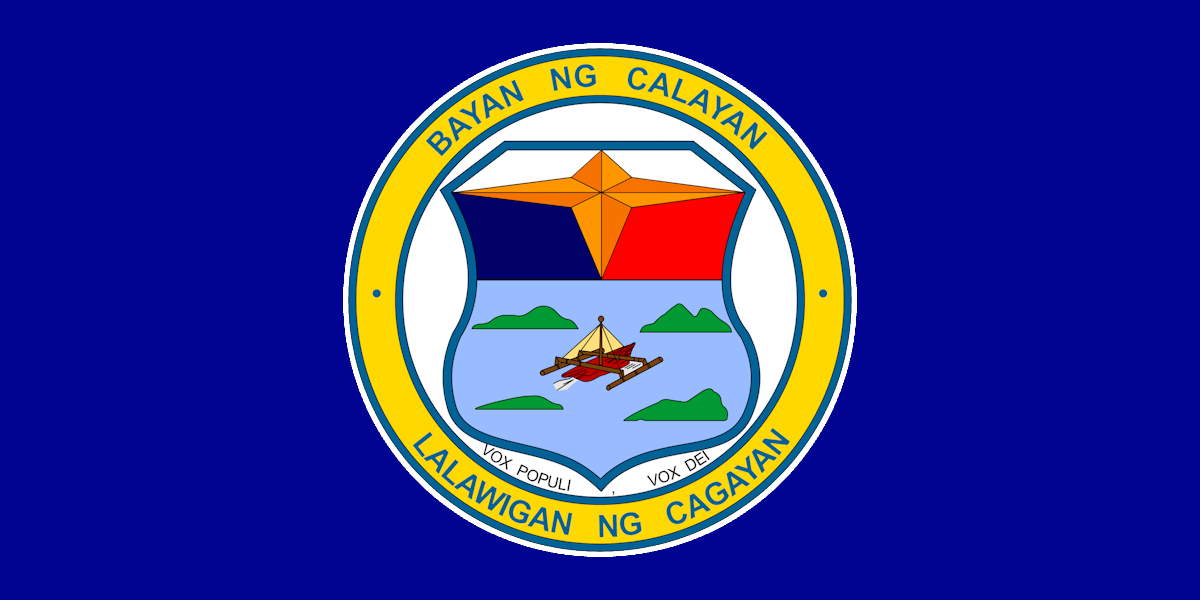
- Flag

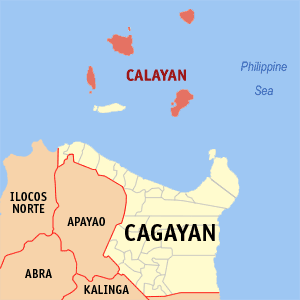
- Map of Cagayan with Calayan highlighted
- Interactive map of Calayan
- Location within the Philippines
- Coordinates: 19°15′43″N 121°28′31″E
- Country: Philippines
- Region: Cagayan Valley
- Province: Cagayan
- District: 2nd district
- Barangays: 12 (see Barangays)

Government
  - Type: Sangguniang Bayan
  - Mayor: Joseph M. Llopis
  - Vice Mayor: Edmund B. Escalante
  - Representative: Samantha Louise V. Alfonso
  - Municipal Council: Members: Josephus R. Llopis; Hante Tan; Allain T. Olivas; Ahmed T. Castillejos; Elena M. Llopis; Teresita P. Singun; Crispiniano G. Tugade; Roque C. Ventura
  - Electorate: 9,900 voters (2025)

Area
  - Total: 494.53 km^{2} (190.94 sq mi)
- Elevation: 9.0 m (29.5 ft)
- Highest elevation: 1,248 m (4,094 ft)
- Lowest elevation: 0 m (0 ft)

Population (2024 census)
  - Total: 18,008
  - Density: 36.414/km^{2} (94.313/sq mi)
  - Households: 4,250

Economy
  - Income class: 1st municipal income class
  - Poverty incidence: 9.88% (2023)
  - Revenue: ₱ 236.4 million (2024)
  - Assets: ₱ 889.5 million (2024)
  - Expenditure: ₱ 234.6 million (2024)
  - Liabilities: ₱ 241.9 million (2024)

Service provider
  - Electricity: Cagayan 2 Electric Cooperative (CAGELCO 2)
- Time zone: UTC+8 (PST)
- ZIP code: 3520
- PSGC: 0201509000
- IDD : area code: +63 (0)78
- Native languages: Ibanag; Ilocano; Ivatan; Tagalog
- Website: www.calayan-cagayan.gov.ph

Calayan, officially the Municipality of Calayan (Ilocano: Ili ti Calayan; Ivatan: Kavahayan nu Calayan; Ibanag: Ili nat Calayan; Tagalog: Bayan ng Calayan), is a municipality in the province of Cagayan, Philippines. According to the 2024 census, it has a population of 18,008 people.

It is home to the Calayan rail, a flightless bird identified as a separate species in 2004 and endemic to Calayan Island.

== History ==
The municipality's name in the Ibanag language literally means "where laya (ginger) abounds".

While Calayan was officially conquered by the Spanish starting in 1619, authorities were only able to maintain a sporadic presence in the area due to its isolated location. It was taken over by the Americans in 1900. In the 1920s, it was briefly placed under the jurisdiction of Aparri after a clerk ran off with the municipal treasury's funds.

== Geography ==
Calayan is located in the Luzon Strait north of Luzon Island and south of Taiwan via Bashi Channel to Luzon Strait. The town is composed of four of the five major islands of the Babuyan Islands namely: Calayan, Camiguin, Dalupiri and Babuyan Island. Calayan Island is the largest of the Babuyan Islands. Fuga Island, the fifth island within the Babuyan Islands, is part of Aparri municipality despite being closer to Claveria.

Calayan Island is located about 24 miles (39 km) west-south-west of Babuyan Island off the north coast of the Philippines and belongs to the Babuyan Islands group in the China Sea. The island is hemmed between Aparri and Batanes islands and it is larger than the Fuga Island, which is 25 miles (40 km) away. It is the second district in the province of Cagayan and its 29th municipality.

Calayan is situated 207.75 kilometres (129.09 mi) from the provincial capital Tuguegarao, and 692.90 kilometres (430.55 mi) from the country's capital city of Manila.

=== Barangays ===
Calayan is politically subdivided into 12 barangays. Each barangay consists of puroks while some have sitios.

- Babuyan Claro (Babuyan Island)
- Balatubat (Camiguin Island)
- Cabudadan
- Centro II
- Dadao
- Dalupiri
- Dibay
- Dilam
- Magsidel
- Minabel - (Camiguin Island)
- Naguilian - (Camiguin Island)
- Poblacion / Centro I

=== Climate ===
Weather conditions are generally wet with heavy rainfall occurring during November and December. The cold winds are the northerly and north-easterly winds. The island is also affected by typhoons. Calayan Island publishes tide tables and solunar tables, daily forecasts for high tides and low tides, other fishing-related data such as the lunar phase, tidal coefficient, sun and moon rising and setting times, hours of maximum fish activity and weather conditions. This data is also useful for all fishing operations in the Calayan Island, apart from navigation of other commercial and transport vessels.

Climate data for Calayan, Cagayan (1991–2020, extremes 1949–2020)
| Month | Jan | Feb | Mar | Apr | May | Jun | Jul | Aug | Sep | Oct | Nov | Dec | Year |
|---|---|---|---|---|---|---|---|---|---|---|---|---|---|
| Record high °C (°F) | 34.9 (94.8) | 35.0 (95.0) | 35.6 (96.1) | 35.8 (96.4) | 37.2 (99.0) | 37.0 (98.6) | 37.8 (100.0) | 37.1 (98.8) | 35.7 (96.3) | 35.0 (95.0) | 34.3 (93.7) | 33.3 (91.9) | 37.8 (100.0) |
| Mean daily maximum °C (°F) | 26.8 (80.2) | 27.4 (81.3) | 28.8 (83.8) | 31.2 (88.2) | 32.4 (90.3) | 32.8 (91.0) | 32.3 (90.1) | 31.8 (89.2) | 31.3 (88.3) | 30.2 (86.4) | 29.3 (84.7) | 27.2 (81.0) | 30.1 (86.2) |
| Daily mean °C (°F) | 23.8 (74.8) | 24.1 (75.4) | 25.3 (77.5) | 27.3 (81.1) | 28.6 (83.5) | 29.0 (84.2) | 28.7 (83.7) | 28.4 (83.1) | 28.0 (82.4) | 27.2 (81.0) | 26.4 (79.5) | 24.3 (75.7) | 26.8 (80.2) |
| Mean daily minimum °C (°F) | 20.7 (69.3) | 20.7 (69.3) | 21.8 (71.2) | 23.5 (74.3) | 24.8 (76.6) | 25.2 (77.4) | 25.1 (77.2) | 25.0 (77.0) | 24.7 (76.5) | 24.2 (75.6) | 23.5 (74.3) | 21.4 (70.5) | 23.4 (74.1) |
| Record low °C (°F) | 13.9 (57.0) | 15.3 (59.5) | 15.8 (60.4) | 17.2 (63.0) | 19.0 (66.2) | 19.1 (66.4) | 19.8 (67.6) | 21.6 (70.9) | 20.2 (68.4) | 17.4 (63.3) | 15.6 (60.1) | 14.8 (58.6) | 13.9 (57.0) |
| Average rainfall mm (inches) | 183.9 (7.24) | 110.7 (4.36) | 68.4 (2.69) | 49.7 (1.96) | 132.6 (5.22) | 161.4 (6.35) | 205.0 (8.07) | 306.1 (12.05) | 379.1 (14.93) | 259.8 (10.23) | 304.7 (12.00) | 320.8 (12.63) | 2,482.2 (97.72) |
| Average rainy days (≥ 1.0 mm) | 16 | 9 | 8 | 5 | 9 | 7 | 10 | 15 | 16 | 15 | 16 | 19 | 145 |
| Average relative humidity (%) | 86 | 86 | 85 | 83 | 85 | 85 | 86 | 87 | 88 | 86 | 87 | 87 | 86 |
Source: PAGASA

== Demographics ==
Population census of Calayan

| Year | Pop. | ±% p.a. |
|---|---|---|
| 1903 | 693 | — |
| 1939 | 2,736 | +3.89% |
| 1948 | 3,501 | +2.78% |
| 1960 | 4,586 | +2.27% |
| 1970 | 6,782 | +3.99% |
| 1975 | 8,234 | +3.97% |
| 1980 | 8,969 | +1.72% |
| 1990 | 11,222 | +2.27% |

| Year | Pop. | ±% p.a. |
|---|---|---|
| 1995 | 12,243 | +1.64% |
| 2000 | 14,309 | +3.40% |
| 2007 | 16,233 | +1.76% |
| 2010 | 16,200 | −0.07% |
| 2015 | 16,702 | +0.58% |
| 2020 | 17,410 | +0.88% |
| 2024 | 18,008 | +0.81% |

Source: Philippine Statistics Authority

In the 2024 census, the population of Calayan was 18,008 people, with a density of 36 inhabitants per square kilometre or 93 inhabitants per square mile.

== Economy ==
Poverty incidence of Calayan (%)

Source: Philippine Statistics Authority

== Local government ==
Calayan is part of the second legislative district of the province of Cagayan. It is governed by a mayor, designated as its local chief executive, and by a municipal council as its legislative body in accordance with the Local Government Code. The mayor, vice mayor, and the municipal councilors are elected directly by the people through an election that is held every three years.

=== Elected officials ===
Members of the Municipal Council (2022-2025)

| Position | Name |
|---|---|
| Congresswoman | Baby Aline Vargas-Alfonso |
| Mayor | Joseph M. Llopis |
| Vice-Mayor | Edmund B. Escalante |
| Councilors | Jericho Llopis |
| Councilors | Paking Llopis |
| Councilors | Allain Olivas |
| Councilors | Elena Llopis |
| Councilors | Ahmed Castillejos |
| Councilors | Tessie Singun |
| Councilors | Crispiniano Tugade |
| Councilors | Rog Ventura |

== Education ==
The Schools Division of Cagayan governs the town's public education system. The division office is a field office of the DepEd in Cagayan Valley region. The Calayan West District Office governs the public and private elementary and high schools throughout the municipality.

=== Primary and elementary schools ===
- Cabudadan Primary School
- Calayan Central School
- Caniwalan Elementary School
- Dadao Elementary School
- Dalupiri Elementary School
- Dibay Elementary School
- Dilam East Primary School
- Dilam Elementary School
- Magsidel Elementary School
- Pilid Elementary School

=== Secondary schools ===
- Calayan High School
- Calayan High School - Dibay Extension
- Calayan High School - Dilam Extension
