= Babuyan Islands =

Island group in the Philippines

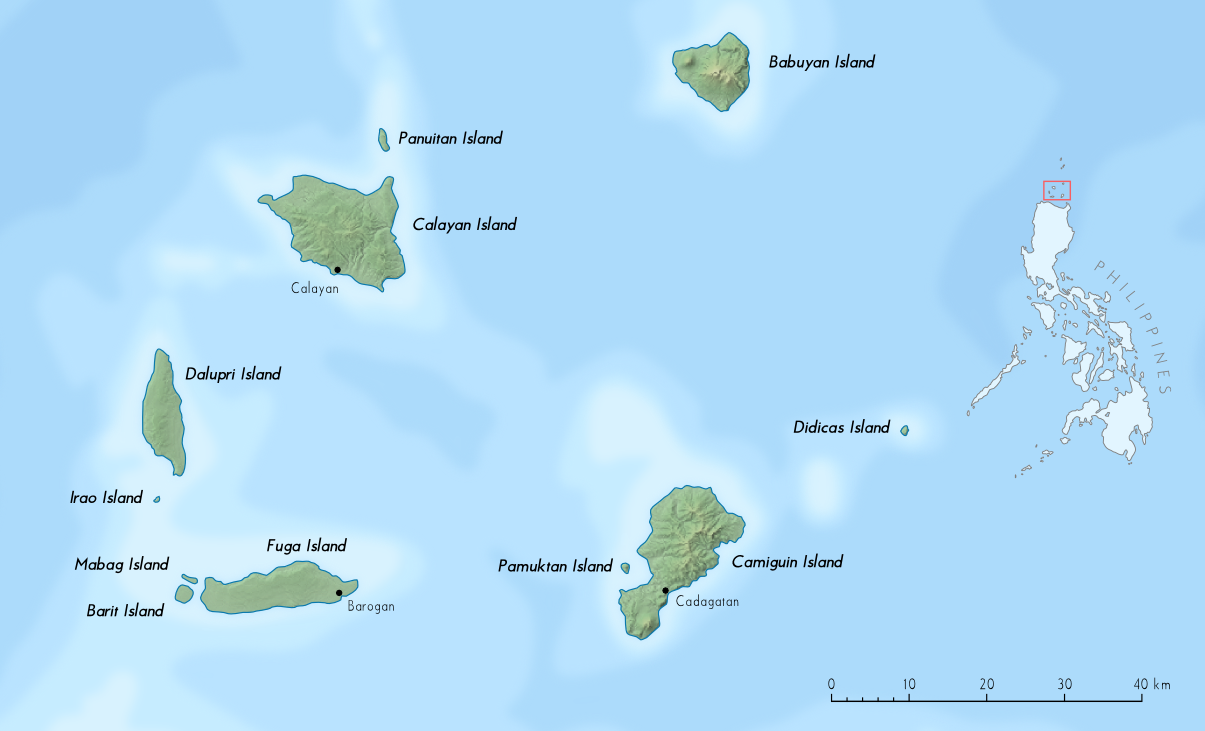
- Babuyan Islands of Luzon Strait

- Location within Philippines

Geography
- Location: Luzon Strait
- Coordinates: 19°15′N 121°40′E
- Adjacent to: Babuyan Channel; Balintang Channel
- Total islands: 24
- Major islands: Babuyan Island; Calayan Island; Camiguin Island; Dalupiri Island; Fuga Island
- Area: 600 km^{2} (230 sq mi)

Administration
- Philippines
- Region: Cagayan Valley
- Province: Cagayan
- Municipality: Aparri; Calayan

Demographics
- Population: 19,349 (2020)
- Pop. density: 32.2/km^{2} (83.4/sq mi)

The Babuyan Islands (/bɑːbəˈjɑːn/ bah-bə-YAHN), also known as the Babuyan Group of Islands, is an archipelago in the Philippines, located in the Luzon Strait north of the main island of Luzon and south of Taiwan. The archipelago consists of five major islands and their surrounding smaller islands. These main islands are, counterclockwise starting from northeast, Babuyan, Calayan, Dalupiri, Fuga, and Camiguin. The Babuyan Islands are separated from Luzon by the Babuyan Channel, and from the province of Batanes to the north by the Balintang Channel.

== Geography ==
The archipelago, comprising 24 volcanic-coralline islands, has a total area of about 590 km^{2} (230 sq mi). The largest of these is Calayan with an area of 196 km^{2} (76 sq mi), while the highest peak in the island group is Mount Pangasun (1,108 metres, 3,635 ft) on Babuyan Claro.

=== Islands ===
The table below shows the islands of Babuyan and their adjoining islets and rocks, along with land areas and highest elevation:

Major island	Adjacent islets	Area	Highest elevation	Population (2020)
Babuyan Claro	Pan de Azucar Island	100 km^{2} 39 sq mi	1,108 m 3,635 ft	1910
Calayan Island	Panuitan Island; Wyllie Rocks	196 km^{2} 76 sq mi	499 m 1,637 ft	9648
Camiguin	Guinapac Rocks; Pamoctan Island (area: 0.7 km^{2}, 0.27 sq mi elevation: 202 m, 663 ft); Pinon Island	166 km^{2} 64 sq mi	828 m 2,717 ft	
Dalupiri Island	Irao Islet	50 km^{2} 19 sq mi	297 m 974 ft	621
Fuga Island	Barit Island; Mabag Island	70 km^{2} 27 sq mi	208 m 682 ft	1939
Didicas Island		0.7 km^{2} 0.27 sq mi	244 m 801 ft	
Balintang Islands				0

=== Geology ===
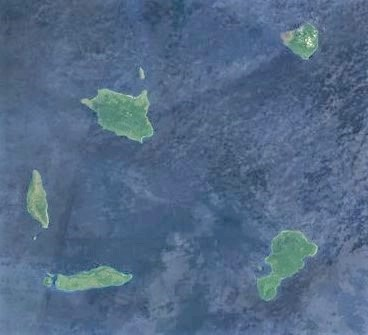
Babuyan Islands satellite image captured by Sentinel-2 in 2016

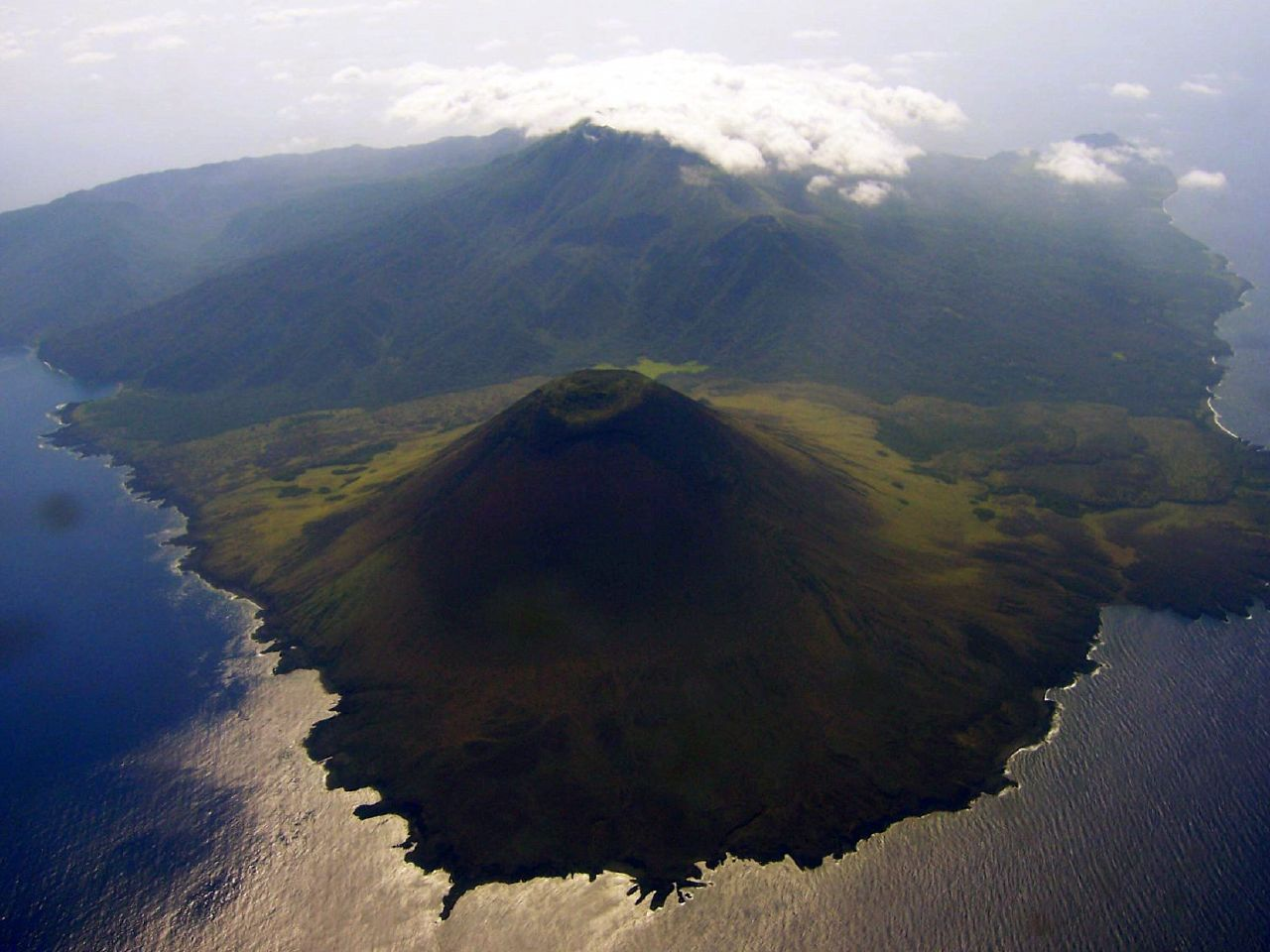
Smith Volcano on Babuyan Island

The eastern islands of the archipelago are part of the Luzon Volcanic Arc. Three volcanoes from two of the islands have erupted in historical times - Camiguin de Babuyanes on Camiguin Island, Babuyan Claro Volcano and Smith Volcano (also known as Mount Babuyan) on Babuyan Island.

Another small volcanic island located just 22 km (14 mi) NE of Camiguin Island, Didicas Volcano on Didicas Island, became a permanent island only after emerging and rising to over 200 metres (656 ft) above sea level in 1952.

== Flora and fauna ==
All of the islands within the island group are classified by the Haribon Foundation and BirdLife International as key biodiversity areas, or sites with outstanding universal value due to their geographic and biological importance. All of the islands within the island group have never been part of any large landmass, and thus have unique flora and fauna, most of which are found nowhere else. Research conducted by the Department of Environment and Natural Resources has found at least five faunal regions in the area, one of the highest densities of separate faunal regions in the world.

The islands are also home to the most critically endangered snake species in the Philippines, the Ross' wolf snake (found only on the small island of Dalupiri), and the most critically endangered bird species in the Philippines, the Calayan rail (found only on the small island of Calayan). The Babuyan archipelago, along with the nearby Batanes islands, have been designated an Important Bird Area (IBA) by BirdLife International because they support significant populations of resident Taiwan green pigeons, Ryukyu scops-owls and short-crested monarchs, Chinese egrets on passage, and wintering yellow buntings.

The island group is also one of the few congregation sites for endangered humpback whales in Southeast Asia. Due to its value to the natural world and Philippine biological diversity, various scientific and conservation groups have been lobbying for its declaration as a national park and its inclusion in the UNESCO World Heritage List. Humpback whales have re-colonized the area and the Babuyan Group of Islands has become the only wintering ground for the species in the Philippines although historical records from the Babuyan Islands have not been confirmed.

== Demographics ==
List of islands by population (as of 2020):

1. Calayan Island - 9,648
2. Camiguin Island - 5,231
3. Fuga Island - 1,939
4. Babuyan Island - 1,910
5. Dalupiri Island - 621
6. Barit Island - 14

== Government ==
The whole archipelago is administered under the province of Cagayan, with Babuyan, Calayan, Camiguin, and Dalupiri comprising the municipality of Calayan while Fuga is under the jurisdiction of Aparri.

Babuyan and Dalupiri are themselves individual barangays in Calayan municipality, respectively named Babuyan Claro and Dalupiri, while Fuga Island is also an individual barangay, also named Fuga Island, in Aparri.
