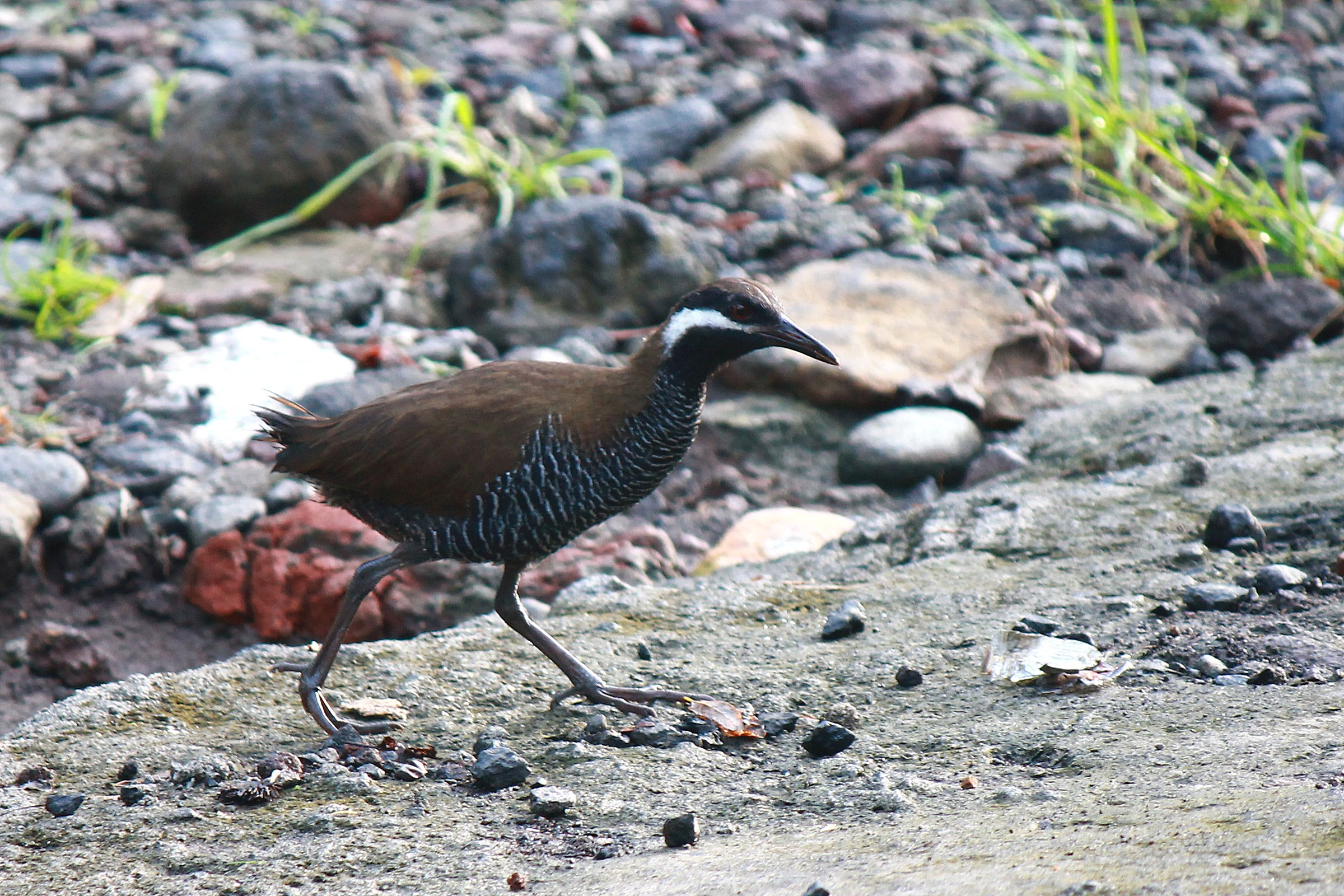
- G. t. celebensis at Manado, Indonesia

Conservation status
- Least Concern (IUCN 3.1)

Scientific classification
- Kingdom: Animalia
- Phylum: Chordata
- Class: Aves
- Order: Gruiformes
- Family: Rallidae
- Genus: Gallirallus
- Species: G. torquatus

Binomial name
- Gallirallus torquatus (Linnaeus, 1766)

Synonyms
- Rallus torquatus Linnaeus, 1766; Hypotaenidia torquata

= Barred rail =

Species of bird

The barred rail (Gallirallus torquatus) is a species of rail found across the Philippines, Sulawesi (Indonesia) and Salawati (western New Guinea). The species is common, but shy and difficult to see. The species was formerly sometimes placed in the genus Hypotaenidia.

This rail is 32–35 cm (13–14 in) in length, and weighs 241–300 g (8.5–10.6 oz).

There are several described subspecies:

- G. t. torquatus
- G. t. celebensis
- G. t. sulcirostris
- G. t. kuehni
- G. t. limarius

Its diet includes (but is not limited to) eggs, such as Philippine megapode eggs.

== See also ==
- Wake Island rail (an extinct rail of Pacific, that only lived on Wake island)
