= Camiguin de Babuyanes =

Volcano on the island of Luzon, Philippines

- Location within Philippines

Highest point
- Elevation: 712 m (2,336 ft)
- Prominence: 712 m (2,336 ft)
- Coordinates: 18°50′00″N 121°51′36″E

Dimensions
- Area: 166 km^{2} (64 mi^{2})

Geography
- Location: Camiguin Island, Calayan, Cagayan, Philippines

Geology
- Rock age: Pliocene
- Mountain type: Stratovolcano
- Volcanic arc: Luzon Volcanic Arc
- Last eruption: 1857

Camiguin de Babuyanes or Mount Camiguin, is an active stratovolcano on Camiguin Island which is part of the Babuyan Islands group that is located in Luzon Strait in the Philippines, north of the island of Luzon located in the municipality of Calayan in the province of Cagayan. The island has a population of 5,231 people in 2020. There has been only one single eruption by the volcano prior to 1857.

Camiguin de Babuyanes is sometimes called Camiguin Norte ("North Camiguin") to distinguish it from Camiguin Island of Mindanao, which in turn is sometimes called Camiguin Sur ("South Camiguin") or Camiguin de Mindanao. Both are volcanic islands.

== Physical features ==
The well-forested mountain has an elevation of 712 metres (2,336 ft) asl, and a base diameter of 3,200 metres (10,500 ft). It occupies the southwest tip of 22 km (14 mi) long Camiguin Island.

The Philippine Institute of Volcanology and Seismology (PHIVOLCS) lists Camiguin de Babuyanes as one of the active volcanoes in the Philippines.

All volcanoes in the Philippines are part of the Pacific ring of fire.

== Eruptions ==
An eruption was recorded around 1857. It was reported as phreatic and possibly partly submarine.

In 1991, there were reports of volcanic activity but instrumental investigations showed no sign of unusual volcanic activity, such as intense fumarolic activity, felt earthquakes, fissuring at the volcano's slopes, or smell of sulphur.

Another report of volcanic unrest was reported in 1993 but an aerial survey of the volcano proved no signs of activity.

== Geology ==
Formation of the island started during the Pliocene era with an andesitic volcano, followed by the subsidiary cones of Minabel to the north and Caanoan in the eastern part of the island.

== See also ==
- List of volcanoes in the Philippines
  - List of active volcanoes in the Philippines
  - List of potentially active volcanoes in the Philippines
  - List of inactive volcanoes in the Philippines
- Philippine Institute of Volcanology and Seismology
