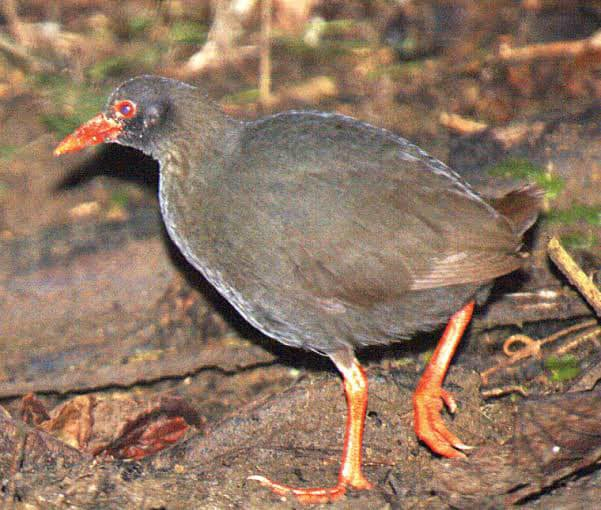

Conservation status
- Vulnerable (IUCN 3.1)

Scientific classification
- Kingdom: Animalia
- Phylum: Chordata
- Class: Aves
- Order: Gruiformes
- Family: Rallidae
- Genus: Gallirallus
- Species: G. calayanensis

Binomial name
- Gallirallus calayanensis Allen, D, Oliveros, Española, Broad & Gonzalez, 2004

Synonyms
- Aptenorallus calayanensis

= Calayan rail =

Species of flightless bird

The Calayan rail (Gallirallus calayanensis) is a flightless bird of the rail, moorhen, and coot family (Rallidae) that inhabits Calayan Island in the Philippines. Though well known to natives of the island as the "piding", it was first observed by ornithologist Carmela Española in May 2004 and the discovery was officially announced on August 16, 2004. It was formerly the only species placed in the genus Aptenorallus.

== Description ==
The Calayan rail is a relatively large flightless rail. Its plumage is dark grayish overall, with a blacker face and slightly browner upperparts. The bill and legs are bright orange-red, unique among similar-sized dark-colored ground-dwelling birds on Calayan. Its vocalizations are loud, harsh, and nasal-sounding.

It measures about 30 cm (12 in) in length and one sub-adult was found to weigh 244 g (8.6 oz).

== Taxonomy ==
It was initially discovered by Carmela Espanola during fieldworlk in the area. The formal description as a species new to science appeared in the journal Forktail (Allen et al. 2004).

Prior to 2022, it was classified in the genus Gallirallus. Following studies in 2012 and 2013, all recent species in the genus Gallirallus aside from the Calayan rail and the weka of New Zealand were moved to the genus Hypotaenidia. Following this, the Calayan rail and the weka were considered the two extant species of the genus Gallirallus. However, a 2021 phylogenetic study found the Calayan rail to be basal to the species classified in Habroptila, Eulabeornis, Gallirallus, and Hypotaenidia, and thus classified it into its own genus, Aptenorallus. This was accepted by the International Ornithological Congress in 2022.

It is monotypic.

== Behaviour and ecology ==
Stomach contents of a specimen contained various insects including snails, beetles and millipedes. This bird forages by pecking and turning over dead leaves. It is probably flightless.

A nest of the calayan rail was found in June and contained 4 eggs. It lays on the ground at the base of a tree loosely made of dried leaves and stems. Its eggs are pale pink and are blotched reddish brown and dark purple, and measure about 35 mm × 25 mm (1.38 in × 0.98 in) in dimensions.

== Habitat and conservation status ==
It is found on the primary and secondary forest on coralline limestone areas on Calayan.

IUCN has assessed this bird as vulnerable with an estimated population of just 2,500 to 4,300 mature individuals. It was initially estimated by biologists in 2004 that there were just 200 pairs on the island. It has since been found to be locally common, with an estimated area of occupancy of 36 km^{2}. However recent species distribution modelling estimated its area of occupancy at 90.2 km^{2} .

The species' main threat is habitat loss with the clearance of forest habitats as a result of logging and agricultural conversion within its range. It is also occasionally caught in snares meant for red junglefowl. It is also threatened by introduced species such as cats, dogs and rats which could prey on these birds and their nests.

The Calayan municipal council has passed Municipal Ordinance No. 84, which prohibits the capture, sale, possession and collection of the species. There are currently many awareness campaigns using this rail as a flagship species. The municipality of Calayan has passed an ordinance establishing the Calayan Wildlife Sanctuary which covers 29km^{2} of the island interior.

Conservation actions proposed include more research is needed to clarify the habitat requirements, range size and population size of the species. Promote the establishment of an environmental monitoring system. Conduct further community consultations and education campaigns. Set up a volunteer network for conservation activities. Develop capacity of local officials and community leaders in managing the recently established wildlife sanctuary and in enforcing its rules and regulations.
