= Aparri =

Municipality in Cagayan, Philippines

- Municipality
- Municipality of Aparri
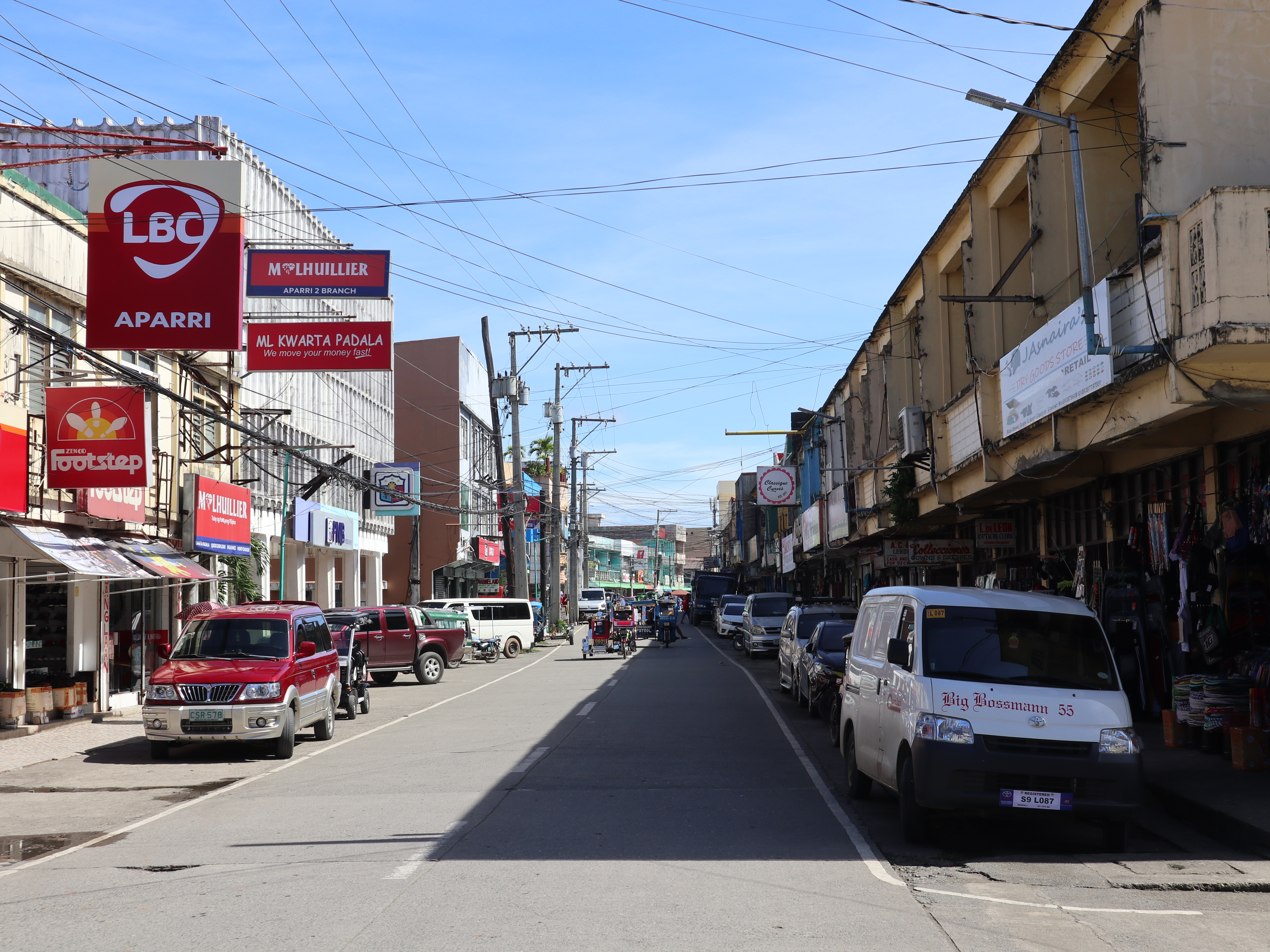
- Aparri Centro

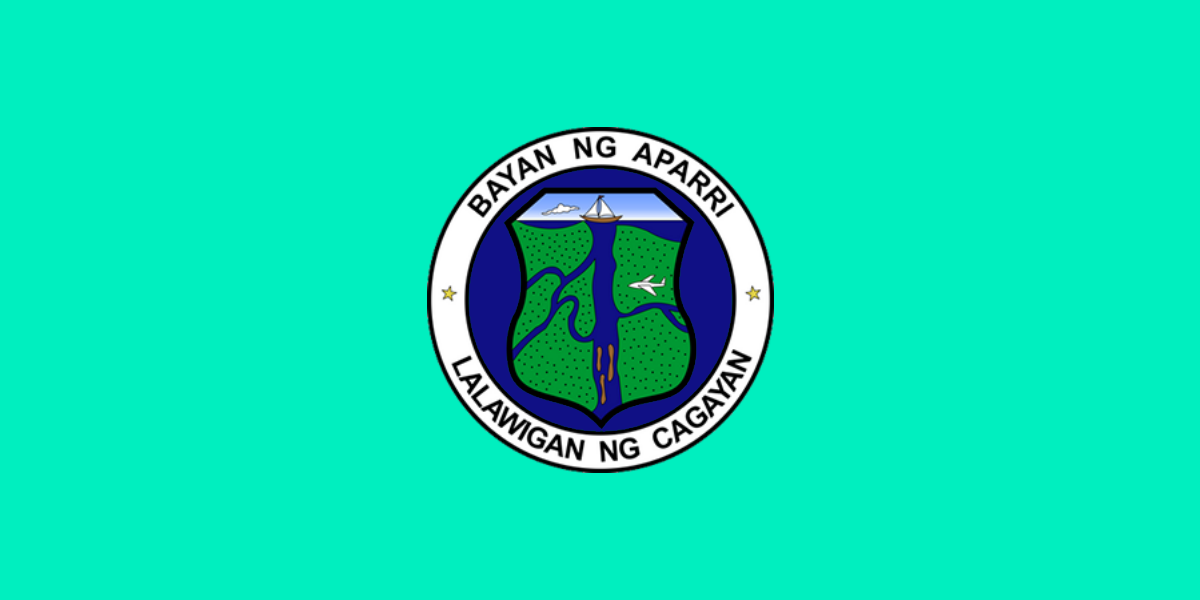
- Flag Seal

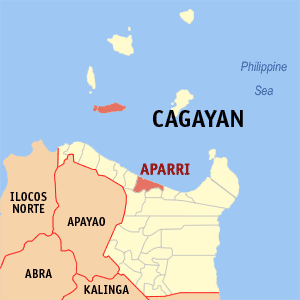
- Map of Cagayan with Aparri highlighted
- Interactive map of Aparri
- Location within the Philippines
- Coordinates: 18°21′27″N 121°38′14″E
- Country: Philippines
- Region: Cagayan Valley
- Province: Cagayan
- District: 1st district
- Barangays: 42 (see Barangays)

Government
  - Type: Sangguniang Bayan
  - Mayor: Dominador J. Dayag
  - Vice Mayor: Bryan Dale G. chan
  - Representative: Ramon C. Nolasco
  - Municipal Council: Members: Labbao Ronald; Tumaru Ismael III; Eslabon Joylyn; Alameda Julie Ann; Dayag Dian Jaycerett; Albanio Joevan; Agbanglo Alex; Chan Larry
  - Electorate: 39,040 voters (2025)

Area
  - Total: 286.64 km^{2} (110.67 sq mi)
- Elevation: 1.0 m (3.3 ft)
- Highest elevation: 22 m (72 ft)
- Lowest elevation: −1 m (−3.3 ft)

Population (2024 census)
  - Total: 68,368
  - Density: 238.52/km^{2} (617.75/sq mi)
  - Households: 15,785

Economy
  - Income class: 1st municipal income class
  - Poverty incidence: 10.52% (2023)
  - Revenue: ₱ 337.8 million (2024)
  - Assets: ₱ 1,233 million (2024)
  - Expenditure: ₱ 327.6 million (2024)
  - Liabilities: ₱ 286 million (2024)

Service provider
  - Electricity: Cagayan 2 Electric Cooperative (CAGELCO 2)
- Time zone: UTC+8 (PST)
- ZIP code: 3515
- PSGC: 0201505000
- IDD : area code: +63 (0)78
- Native languages: Ilocano; Ibanag; Tagalog
- Website: web.archive.org/web/20090913053212/http://lguaparri.org/index.htm

Aparri, officially the Municipality of Aparri (Ibanag: Ili nat Aparri, Ilocano: Ili ti Aparri, Tagalog: Bayan ng Aparri), is a municipality in the province of Cagayan, Philippines. According to the 2024 census, it has a population of 68,368 people.

The town is a bustling municipality and the primary growth center of northern Cagayan. It serves as the center of education, commerce and culture in the northern part of the region, which includes towns of the first and second districts of Cagayan, as well as the towns of Apayao and some towns of Ilocos Norte. It serves as the show window of commerce and finance, economic transformation, information technology, livelihood development, fashion and culture, leisure and entertainment, agricultural modernization, and good local governance.

There is a meteorological station in Barangay Punta where the Cagayan River empties into the Babuyan Channel.

== Etymology ==
The origin of the name Aparri has been disputed. One version says that the town was named by Spanish conquistador Juan Pablo Carreón, who, upon landing there in 1581, named the town after the colloquial word for "supper" in his hometown. Another version claims that the name comes from the Spanish word aparte ("separate"), referring to the town's separation from Camalaniugan and Buguey in 1680. Still another version says that the town's name comes from the Ibanag word apparian ("a place where there are many priests").

== History ==
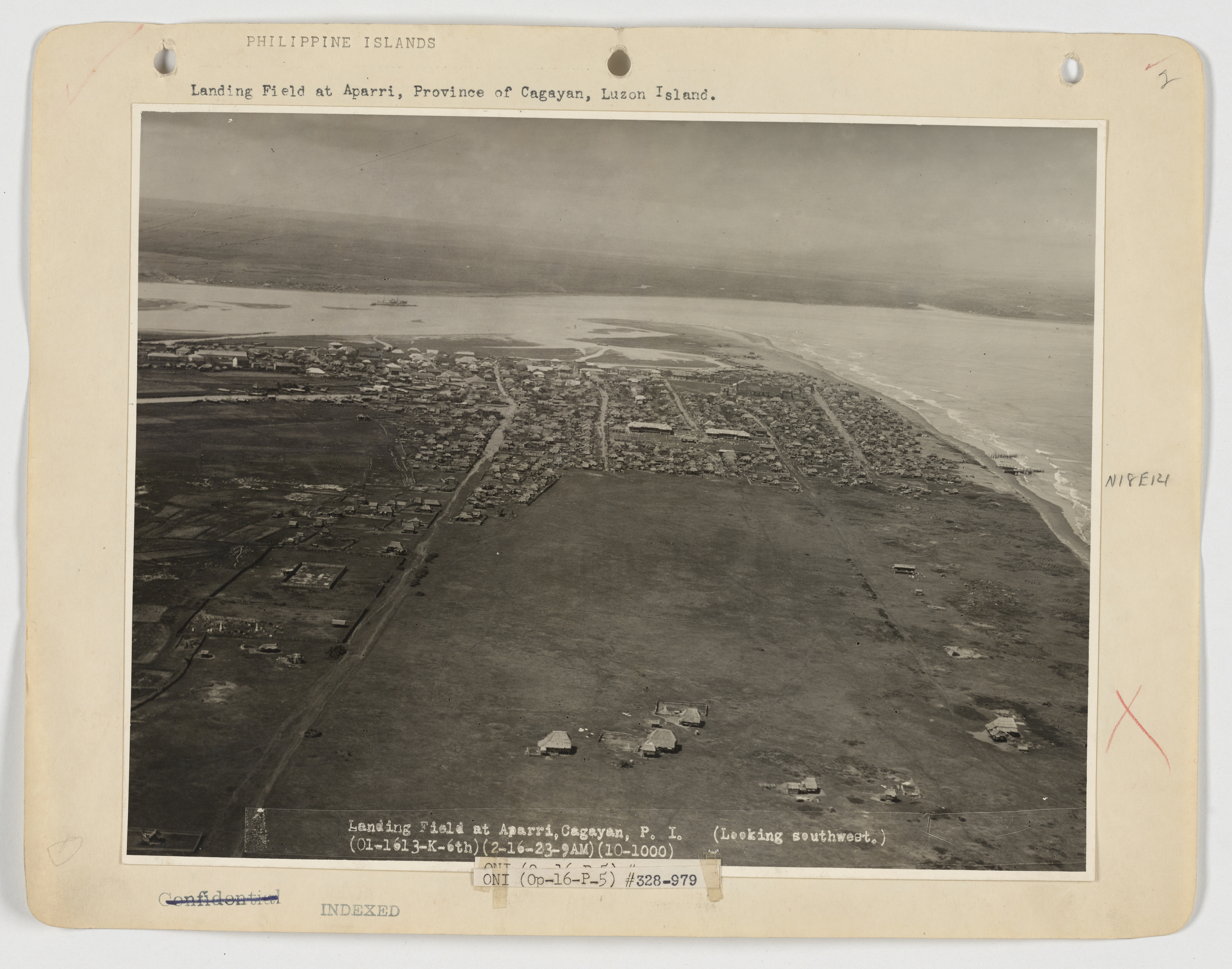
Aerial view of Aparri, 1923

Aparri was formerly a Japanese trading post because of its location at the northern tip of Luzon at the mouth of the Cagayan River. It was the main area for trade between Japan and the island of Luzon. Much of the area was once home to the native Ibanag people, who were at the time in alliance with Japan as an early form of an informal protectorate city-state. It was formally established under Spanish rule in 1605 after the Spanish Crown seized the Philippines and made it part of the Spanish East Indies. The river running through Aparri was the site of the famed 1582 Cagayan battles, the only major skirmish between Spanish Tercios and accompanying Mexican auxiliaries and Japanese rōnin (masterless samurai) with their Chinese pirate confederates. Since it was on the route of Spanish galleons during the great tobacco monopoly in the 16th to the 17th centuries, Aparri was therefore made one of the major Spanish ports of the Galleon Trade on May 11, 1680. The original inhabitants of this town were the Ybanags. Later, as the Spaniards settled and because of its strategic location, Ilocanos and Chinese people settled in the area. In 1771 it was raided by Moro vessels from Jolo. Towards the end of the Spanish occupation and in 1901, at the start of the American occupation, attempts were made to make Aparri the provincial capital of Cagayan, all of which were unsuccessful.

During the Philippine Revolution, Aparri was the site of the landing of soldiers of the Philippine Revolutionary Army led by Daniel Tirona, which marked the beginning of the end of Spanish rule in Cagayan Valley, on August 25, 1898.

On May 11, 1926, Joaquín Loriga and Eduardo Gallarza landed on his first-ever long flight in an autogyro from Spain to Manila. Before the outbreak of World War II, it became a transshipment point for smuggled goods from China, Taiwan, and other neighboring Southeast Asian nations. Aparri was one of the first places occupied by the Japanese in their invasion of the Philippines during the war, landing there on December 10, 1941. Donald Blackburn's guerrilla forces and the local troops of the Philippine Commonwealth Army and Philippine Constabulary supported the Sixth United States Army Force B in the capture of Aparri on June 20, 1945.

On February 19, 2023, Vice Mayor Rommel Alameda was shot and killed along with five others in an ambush in Bagabag, Nueva Vizcaya.

== Geography ==
Aparri sits at the mouth of the Cagayan River, the longest river in the Philippines. It administers Fuga Island, which is part of the Babuyan Group and is much closer to Claveria.

Aparri is situated 104.47 kilometers (64.91 mi) from the provincial capital Tuguegarao, and 589.62 kilometers (366.37 mi) from the country's capital city of Manila.

=== Barangays ===
Aparri is politically subdivided into 42 barangays. Each barangay consists of puroks, while some have sitios.

- Backiling
- Bangag
- Binalan
- Bisagu
- Bukig
- Bulala Norte
- Bulala Sur
- Caagaman
- Centro 1 (Poblacion)
- Centro 2 (Poblacion)
- Centro 3 (Poblacion)
- Centro 4 (Poblacion)
- Centro 5 (Poblacion)
- Centro 6 (Poblacion)
- Centro 7 (Poblacion)
- Centro 8 (Poblacion)
- Centro 9 (Poblacion)
- Centro 10 (Poblacion)
- Centro 11 (Poblacion)
- Centro 12 (Poblacion)
- Centro 13 (Poblacion)
- Centro 14 (Poblacion)
- Centro 15 (Poblacion)
- Dodan
- Fuga Island
- Gaddang
- Linao
- Mabanguc
- Macanaya (Pescaria)
- Maura
- Minanga
- Navagan
- Paddaya
- Paruddun Norte
- Paruddun Sur
- Plaza
- Punta
- San Antonio
- Sanja
- Tallungan
- Toran
- Zinarag

=== Climate ===
Climate data for Aparri (1991–2020, extremes 1903–2020)
| Month | Jan | Feb | Mar | Apr | May | Jun | Jul | Aug | Sep | Oct | Nov | Dec | Year |
|---|---|---|---|---|---|---|---|---|---|---|---|---|---|
| Record high °C (°F) | 33.9 (93.0) | 35.8 (96.4) | 36.1 (97.0) | 38.4 (101.1) | 39.0 (102.2) | 38.0 (100.4) | 37.2 (99.0) | 37.5 (99.5) | 36.1 (97.0) | 36.2 (97.2) | 35.5 (95.9) | 33.2 (91.8) | 39.0 (102.2) |
| Mean daily maximum °C (°F) | 27.7 (81.9) | 28.4 (83.1) | 30.3 (86.5) | 32.2 (90.0) | 33.2 (91.8) | 33.7 (92.7) | 33.1 (91.6) | 32.6 (90.7) | 32.3 (90.1) | 31.1 (88.0) | 29.9 (85.8) | 28.0 (82.4) | 31.1 (88.0) |
| Daily mean °C (°F) | 24.3 (75.7) | 24.8 (76.6) | 26.4 (79.5) | 28.1 (82.6) | 28.9 (84.0) | 29.4 (84.9) | 29.0 (84.2) | 28.7 (83.7) | 28.3 (82.9) | 27.6 (81.7) | 26.6 (79.9) | 24.9 (76.8) | 27.3 (81.1) |
| Mean daily minimum °C (°F) | 21.0 (69.8) | 21.2 (70.2) | 22.6 (72.7) | 23.9 (75.0) | 24.7 (76.5) | 25.0 (77.0) | 24.9 (76.8) | 24.7 (76.5) | 24.4 (75.9) | 24.0 (75.2) | 23.3 (73.9) | 21.8 (71.2) | 23.5 (74.3) |
| Record low °C (°F) | 15.0 (59.0) | 13.7 (56.7) | 15.0 (59.0) | 16.0 (60.8) | 20.0 (68.0) | 17.8 (64.0) | 17.0 (62.6) | 20.0 (68.0) | 21.0 (69.8) | 19.0 (66.2) | 16.3 (61.3) | 15.0 (59.0) | 13.7 (56.7) |
| Average rainfall mm (inches) | 95.5 (3.76) | 62.2 (2.45) | 35.5 (1.40) | 38.1 (1.50) | 110.6 (4.35) | 114.9 (4.52) | 196.1 (7.72) | 195.0 (7.68) | 224.5 (8.84) | 280.9 (11.06) | 309.9 (12.20) | 229.5 (9.04) | 1,892.7 (74.52) |
| Average rainy days (≥ 1.0 mm) | 11 | 8 | 4 | 4 | 8 | 8 | 10 | 11 | 12 | 15 | 15 | 15 | 121 |
| Average relative humidity (%) | 87 | 85 | 84 | 83 | 82 | 81 | 82 | 83 | 84 | 85 | 87 | 88 | 84 |
Source: PAGASA

== Demographics ==
Population census of Aparri

| Year | Pop. | ±% p.a. |
|---|---|---|
| 1903 | 18,252 | — |
| 1918 | 20,912 | +0.91% |
| 1939 | 26,409 | +1.12% |
| 1948 | 24,974 | −0.62% |
| 1960 | 33,424 | +2.46% |
| 1970 | 40,307 | +1.89% |
| 1975 | 42,419 | +1.03% |
| 1980 | 45,070 | +1.22% |

| Year | Pop. | ±% p.a. |
|---|---|---|
| 1990 | 51,635 | +1.37% |
| 1995 | 53,639 | +0.72% |
| 2000 | 59,046 | +2.08% |
| 2007 | 61,024 | +0.46% |
| 2010 | 61,199 | +0.10% |
| 2015 | 65,649 | +1.35% |
| 2020 | 68,839 | +1.00% |
| 2024 | 68,368 | −0.16% |

Source: Philippine Statistics Authority

In the 2024 census, the population of Aparri was 68,368 people, with a density of 240 inhabitants per square kilometer or 620 inhabitants per square mile.

== Economy ==
Poverty incidence of Aparri (%)

Source: Philippine Statistics Authority

Aparri has an approximate income of ₱250 million. The valley has been one of the largest tobacco-producing sections in the Philippines, and the town has a considerable coastwise trade.

=== Tourism ===
Archdiocesan Shrine of Our Lady of the Most Holy Rosary

Aparri is known for its foods such as the "bulung-unas", or ribbon fish (aka belt fish), which are in abundance during January and early February. "Kilawin naguilas-asan" is a fillet of smaller "bulung-unas" which are leftover baits, soaked in Ilocos vinegar and seasoned with salt and pepper as well as finely cut onions and ginger. Ludong, a variety of Pacific salmon, is the Philippines' most expensive fish, ranging from 4,000 pesos to 5,000 per kilo. Because of its price and its distinct taste and smell, it is also nicknamed "President Fish". Caught only in the Aparri delta when, after a heavy rainfall, these fish are washed down by the fast-raging water from the south, down to the mouth of the Cagayan River, where it meets the Babuyan Sea. Freshwater fish by nature, the saltwater contributes to their delicious taste. Ludong is available only in the rainy months of October and early November.

Aparri's attractions also include its sandy beaches and town fiesta. Between May 1 and 12 of every year, the town's fiesta celebrates the patron saint San Pedro Gonzales of Thelmo with nightly festivities at the auditorium, crowning of the Miss Aparri beauty pageant, and the "Comparza".

It is home to the Archdiocesan Shrine of Our Lady of the Most Holy Rosary and the Shrine of San Lorenzo Ruiz de Manila. Holy Week is celebrated in Aparri with the observance of Holy Thursday and Good Friday in the town churches. In the early hours of Easter Sunday, the "Domingo Sabet" celebrates the meeting of Jesus and the Holy Mother after the resurrection.

== Government ==
=== Local government ===
Aparri is part of the first legislative district of the province of Cagayan. It is governed by a mayor, designated as its local chief executive, and by a municipal council as its legislative body in accordance with the Local Government Code. The mayor, vice mayor, and councilors are elected directly by the people through an election held every three years.

=== Elected officials ===
Members of the Municipal Council Province of Cagayan 1st Legislative District (2025-2028)
| Position | Name |
|---|---|
| Governor | Edgar B. Aglipay |
| Congressman | Ramon C. Nolasco |
| Mayor | Dominador J. Dayag |
| Vice-Mayor | Bryan Dale G. Chan |
| Councilors | Labbao Marlon |
| Councilors | Tumaru Ismael III |
| Councilors | Eslabon Joylyn |
| Councilors | Alameda Julie Ann |
| Councilors | Dayag Dian Jaycerett |
| Councilors | Albanio Joevan |
| Councilors | Agbanglo Alex |
| Councilors | Chan Larry |

== Education ==
The Schools Division of Cagayan governs the town's public education system. The division office is a field office of the DepEd in the Cagayan Valley region. There are two schools district office that govern both the public and private elementary and high schools throughout the municipality. These are the Aparri East District and the Aparri West District.

=== Primary and elementary schools ===
- Aparri East Central School
- Aparri Kete Chinese School
- Aparri South Central School
- Aparri West Central School
- Backiling Elementary School
- Bangag Elementary School
- Binalan Elementary School
- Bulala Sur Elementary School
- Caroronan Primary School
- Dodan Elementary School
- Gaddang Elementary School
- Linao Elementary School
- Maura Elementary School
- Minanga Elementary School
- Nanappatan Elementary School
- Navagan Elementary School
- Paruddun Norte Elementary School
- Plaza Primary School
- Punta Elementary School
- San Antonio Elementary School
- Sanja Elementary School
- Tallungan Elementary School
- Zinarag Elementary School

=== Secondary schools ===
- Aparri East National High School
- Aparri School of Arts and Trades
- Aparri West National High School
- Bukig National Agricultural and Technical School
- Lyceum of Aparri
- St. Paul School of Aparri

=== Higher educational institutions ===
- Cagayan State University (Aparri Campus)
- Cagayan Valley Institute
- Lyceum Of Aparri

== Notable personalities ==
- Kakai Bautista, Filipino actress, host, singer and comedienne
- Maja Salvador, actress, singer and television personality

== Media ==
=== FM Radio Stations ===
- DWWW - Radyo Natin FM 102.1 (Manila Broadcasting Company)
- DWBI - Radyo Kidlat FM 103.9 (Presidential Broadcast Service)

=== TV Stations ===
- DZBB - GMA-13 (GMA Network, Inc.)
- DWGP - GTV-26 (GMA Network, Inc.)
- DWAX - ABS-CBN-9 (ABS-CBN Corporation; defunct)

=== Cable TV Operators ===
- Aparri Cable TV Services
- New Vision Satellite Network (branches in Aparri, Abulug and Ballesteros)
