= Luzon Strait =

Strait between Luzon and Taiwan

Coordinates: 21°0′N 121°0′E

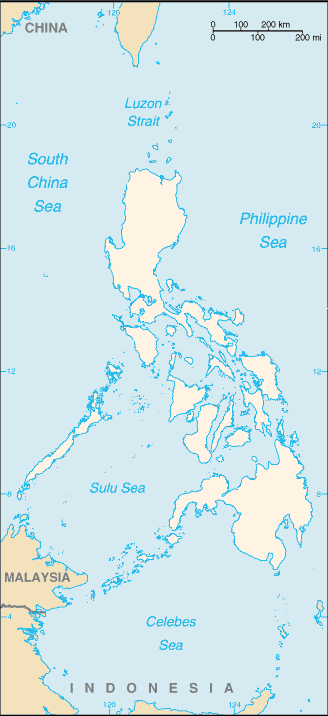
- The Luzon Strait between the islands of Luzon and Taiwan

- Location within Southeast Asia
- Location: Southeast Asia and East Asia
- Basin countries: Luzon island of the Philippines, Taiwan
- Max. width: 250 kilometers (160 mi)
- Max. depth: ca. 4,000 meters (13,000 ft)

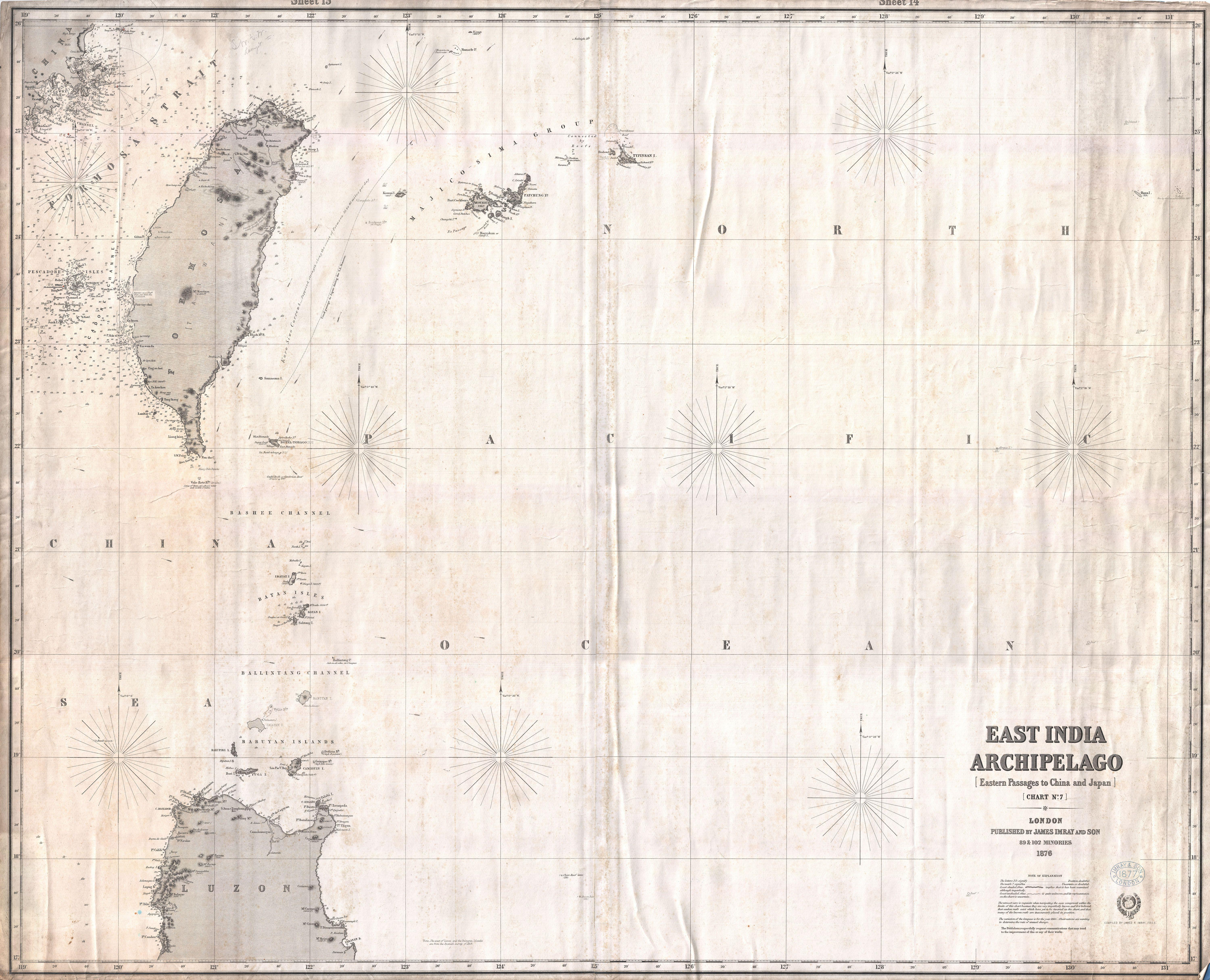
Old map of the Luzon Strait

The Luzon Strait (Tagalog: Kipot ng Luzon, Chinese: 呂宋海峽; pinyin: Lǚsòng hǎixiá; Pe̍h-ōe-jī: Lū-sòng Hái-kiap) is a strait in the western Pacific Ocean between Luzon in the Philippines and Taiwan, serving as a passage from the Philippine Sea to the South China Sea.

It is further divided into a number of smaller channels: the Babuyan Channel between the Luzon mainland and the Babuyan Islands; the Balintang Channel which then separates the Babuyans from the Batanes Islands, and the Bashi Channel which separates the Batanes from Taiwan. It should not be confused with the Taiwan Strait, the shallower strait which passes between Taiwan and the Asian mainland.

The Luzon Strait is a major biological and ecological hotspot because its deep water channels allow the deep ocean layer flow of nutrient-rich Pacific water (called the Kuroshio Current Intrusion) into the northern part of the South China Sea, and because it is a major marine ecological corridor, serving as a migratory path and home to 18 migratory and resident seabird species and essential foraging grounds for marine mammals such as the humpback whale.

It is economically and geopolitically important as one of the world's major maritime choke points between the Americas and various important East Asian ports, and as the site of many submarine communications cables provide important data and telephony services to East and Southeast Asia.

== Description ==
The Luzon Strait is approximately 250 kilometers (160 mi) wide containing a number of islands belonging to the Philippines that are grouped into two: the islands comprising the province of Batanes and the Babuyan Islands, which are part of the province of Cagayan.

=== Babuyan, Balintang, and Bashi Channels ===
The strait is divided into a number of smaller channels. The Babuyan Channel stretches from the northern shoreline of Cagayan Province on the Luzon mainland to Fuga and Camiguin de Babuyanes Islands which are the southernmost of the Babuyan Island Groups. The Balintang Channel stretches from the main Babuyan Island to Sabtang Island in the Batanes Island Group, with the seven small, uninhabited Balintang islands in the middle. Lastly, the Bashi Channel has Mavulis Island in the Batanes Island Group as its southern boundary, and Orchid Island and Cape Eluanbi on the Taiwan mainland as its northern boundary.

=== Bathymetry ===
The depth of the strait reaches the 3,500 m and 4,000 contours in north–south trenches in the middle and south-western edge. At a mean depth of 2200m, it is significantly deeper than the nearby Taiwan Strait, which has a mean depth of only 60m.

=== Waves and tides ===
Some of the largest ocean waves in the world, at times over 170 meters in height and stemming from tides and ocean currents, are found in the north of the strait. These waves or currents are underwater and rarely break the surface, thus posing no danger to shipping but are sometimes visible to satellites. The oscillation is largely prompted by a long north–south ridge which covers almost all of the strait, then amplified in the northern section by a second parallel ridge.

== Ecological significance ==
The Luzon strait is ecologically important because it connects the South China Sea with the rest of the Western Pacific Ocean, because its islands serve as jumping points for species moving between Taiwan and the Philippine Archipelago, and because the strait itself and the islands within it include diverse habitats including coastal and island ecosystems, pelagic and open ocean habitats, and deep sea and benthic environments.

=== Oceanographic circulation ===
The Luzon strait plays an important role as the main channel linking the waters of the West Philippine Sea and the South China Sea with the Philippine Sea and the rest of the Western Pacific Ocean. This includes the seasonal Kuroshio Current Intrusion in the upper and intermediate columns of the strait's waters which brings oxygen rich oliogtrophic waters into the northern West Philippine Sea, and the deep-water overflow in the Luzon Strait in the deep and abyssmal columns of the straight which allows the dense and cold waters of the Western Pacific Ocean to circulate into the depths of the South China Sea basin.

==== Kuroshio Current Intrusion ====
At various times of the year, the Kuroshio current - a powerful north-flowing western boundary current that transports warm equatorial water poleward and forms the western limb of the North Pacific Subtropical Gyre - leaks up to 13.7 Sverdrup... into the Luzon Strait after having flown along the eastern Philippine coast, before continuing along the Japanese coast. This affects the heat and salt budgets and circulation and eddy generation mechanisms in the South China Sea.

The deep sub-surface layers of this current bring nutrient-rich water into the northern South China Sea, enriching its dissolved organic matter stores and enhancing its ammonia oxidation. Bacteria and phytoplankton use these resources to grow and support their biogeochemical activities.

The Kuroshio current intrusion also oxidizes and increases the salinity of the sedimentary environment northwest of Luzon Island. The intrusion transports sediment high in illite and chlorite concentrations from around Taiwan southwestward into the deep sea environment. Pearl river sediments, high in concentrations of kaolinite and titanium, are also transported southwestward by the intrusion

=== Biodiversity ===
The Luzon strait serves as home to numerous migratory and resident seabird species and essential foraging grounds for marine mammals.

==== Resident species ====
Among the endangered species that call the strait home are the Calayan Rail (Aptenorallus calayanensis), the Batanes Pit Viper (Trimeresurus mcgregori), the Ryukyu Flying Fox (Pteropus dasymallus), and the Arius (Podocarpus costalis), a species of conifer in the family Podocarpaceae.

The strait also contains the Philippines' only known breeding ground for Humpback whales (Megaptera novaeangliae).

==== Migratory Pathways ====
Aside from resident species, the Luzon strait is also significant as a migration path, both for marine species and for avian species. In the Philippine part of the strait, the Batanes Islands are specifically recognized as a key study area because of their location along migratory paths, while the Babuyan Island Group is particularly recognized as a marine Key Biodiversity Areas (mKBA) of the Philippines.

== Cultural significance ==
The Luzon Strait is also extremely culturally significant, being a pathway between the Philippine Archipelago and Taiwan. It is believed to be the site of significant human movement and cultural exchange during the Neolithic era, and are the home waters of the Ivatan and the Yami peoples, as well as to the Batanic languages spoken amongst them.

== Significance to global maritime traffic ==
The Luzon Strait is the shortest possible shipping node for maritime traffic originating from the nations of Southeast Asia; combined with the collective Maritimes Southern East Asia of China, Hong Kong, Macau, and Taiwan, who are all sharing the South China Sea and it's complex economic network, with maritime traffic reaching across South and North America, wherein the Luzon Strait is the most necessary chokepoint for these two centers of gravity for economic activity. The Luzon Strait in particular is the quickest sea lane possible, for ships travelling to and fro; Southern China and Southeast Asia, and; the Panama Canal plus South America.

== Significance to global communications ==
Many submarine communications cables also pass through the Luzon Strait. These cables provide important data and telephony services to: mainland China, Hong Kong, Taiwan, Japan and South Korea. These cables also connect to Southeast Asia: Singapore, Malaysia, Brunei, Vietnam, and Thailand. The Luzon strait also hosts cables that span Southeast Asia and the Western coasts of the Americas, mainly: the United States, and Mexico.

== History ==
=== Precolonial era ===
The Luzon Strait is believed to have been crossed by early human populations during the neolithic period. As the obvious maritime transport route between Taiwan and the Philippines, as well as the genetically and linguistically linked indigenous peoples of Taiwan and of Northeastern Luzon, the Luzon Strait looms large in theories of migration to the Philippines, sometimes eliciting controversy as in the case of the debate between the "Out of Taiwan" and "Out of Sundaland" models.

=== World War II ===
The Luzon Strait was part of the Japanese invasion route during the Second World War. On December 8, 1941 (the same day as the Japanese attack on Pearl Harbor, due to the International Date Line), forces of the Empire of Japan landed on Batanes. By December 10, they had occupied Camiguin de Babuyanes in the Babuyan Islands (not to be confused with the island-province of Camiguin off northern Mindanao) in a soon-abandoned attempt to establish a seaplane base, and on the same day landed at Aparri, Cagayan on Luzon.

Subsequently, during the Second World War, many US submarines hunted Japanese convoys passing through the strait on their way from the East Indies to Japan.
