= Luzon Volcanic Arc =

Chain of volcanoes from Taiwan to Luzon

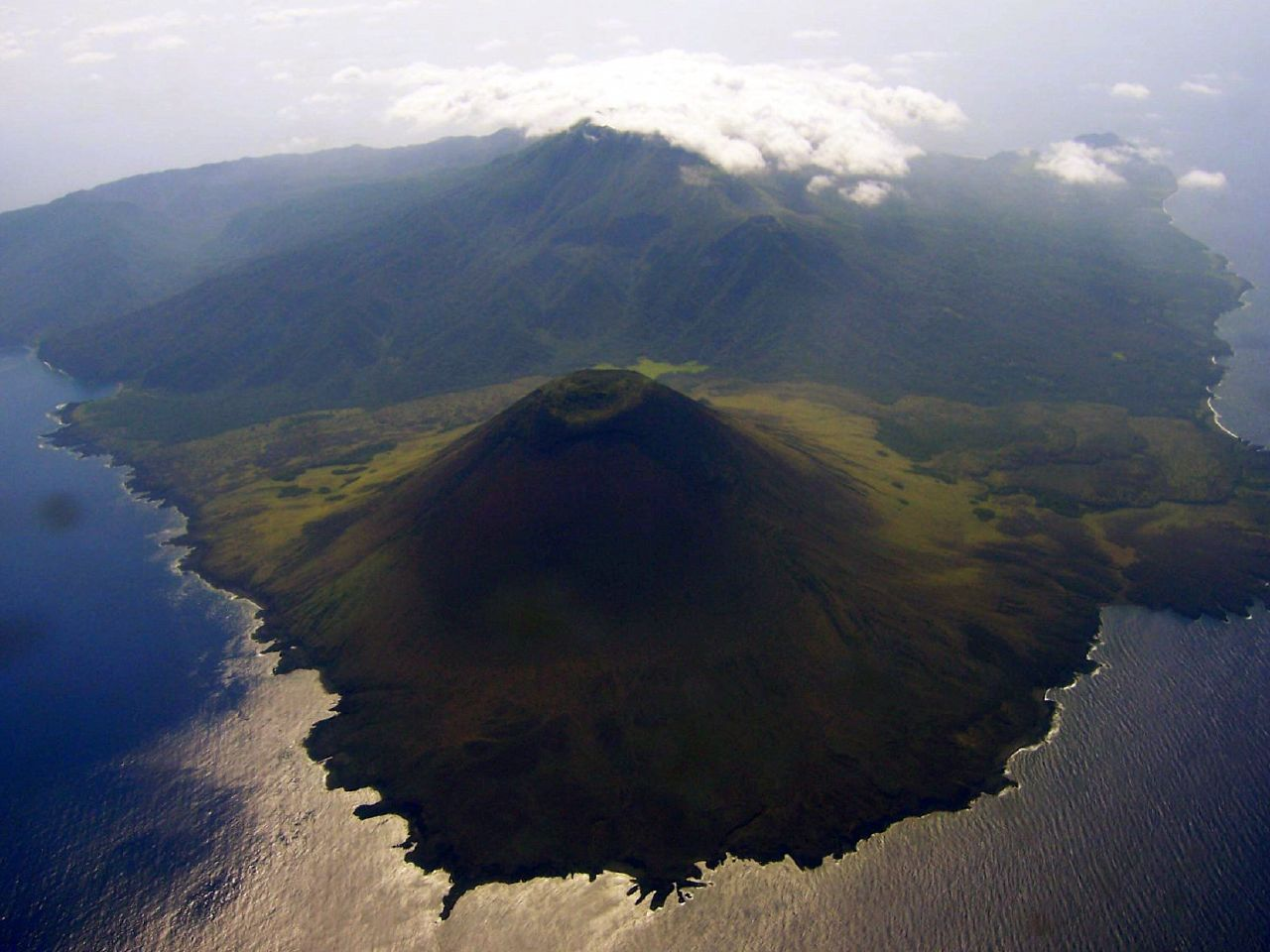
Smith Volcano in the Babuyan Islands

The Luzon Volcanic Arc is a chain of volcanoes in a north–south line across the Luzon Strait from Taiwan to Luzon. The name "Luzon Volcanic Arc" was first proposed by Carl Bowin et al. to describe a series of Miocene to recent volcanoes due to eastward subduction along the Manila Trench for approximately 1,200 km from the Coastal Range in Taiwan south to southern Mindoro in the Philippines. Islands that form part of the arc are the Eastern Coastal Range of Taiwan, Green Island, Taiwan, Orchid Island, Kaotai Rock, Mavudis or Y'ami Island, Mabudis, Siayan Island, Itbayat Island, Diogo Island, Batan Island, Unnamed volcano Ibuhos, Sabtang Island, Babuyan, Didicas, and Camiguin de Babuyanes. At the south end it terminates on Luzon.

The geochemistry of a number of volcanoes along the arc have been measured. There are five distinct geochemical domains within the arc (Mindoro, Bataan, Northern Luzon, Babuyan, and Taiwan). The geochemistry of the segments verified that the volcanoes are all subduction related (e.g., strong niobium anomalies and calc-alkaline characteristics). Isotopes and trace elements show unique geochemical characteristics in the north. Geochemical variations northward (Babuyan segment) were due to the subduction of sediments derived from the erosion of continental crust from China and Taiwan.

== Geochemistry and tectonic setting ==
There is a distinct increase in strontium isotopic ratios with latitude northward. This supports the conjecture that the variations were due to an increasing "crustal" component in subducted sediments as the continental blocks in the north were approached (China and Taiwan). The sediment thicknesses increased toward the north along the trench.

The geochemistry and tectonic setting of the southern Luzon arc has been studied in detail. The geochemistry suggested that continental crust (probably from sediments) played an important role in the Macolod corridor and the Mindoro segments. Crustal collision had occurred in the south between the North Palawan-Mindoro crustal block and perhaps sediment contamination was derived from this region. This substantiates preliminary early isotope and trace element studies on the central Luzon arc.

Further work was done on the northern Luzon arc by McDermott et al. who found systematic variations in an assortment of isotopes with latitude not only in the lavas analyzed over the 500 km section of the arc but also in sediments along the trench. The only way to explain the latitudinal variations was through the addition of an increasing input of terrigenous sediments toward the continental regions in the north China and Taiwan.

During the Middle Miocene, 16-15 Ma, activity started in Taiwan. Batan Island volcanics are dated at 9.36 Ma, while north of Luzon, the volcanic islands are younger than 6.5 Ma.

== See also ==
- Philippine Mobile Belt
- Volcanic arc
