= Baselines of the Philippines =

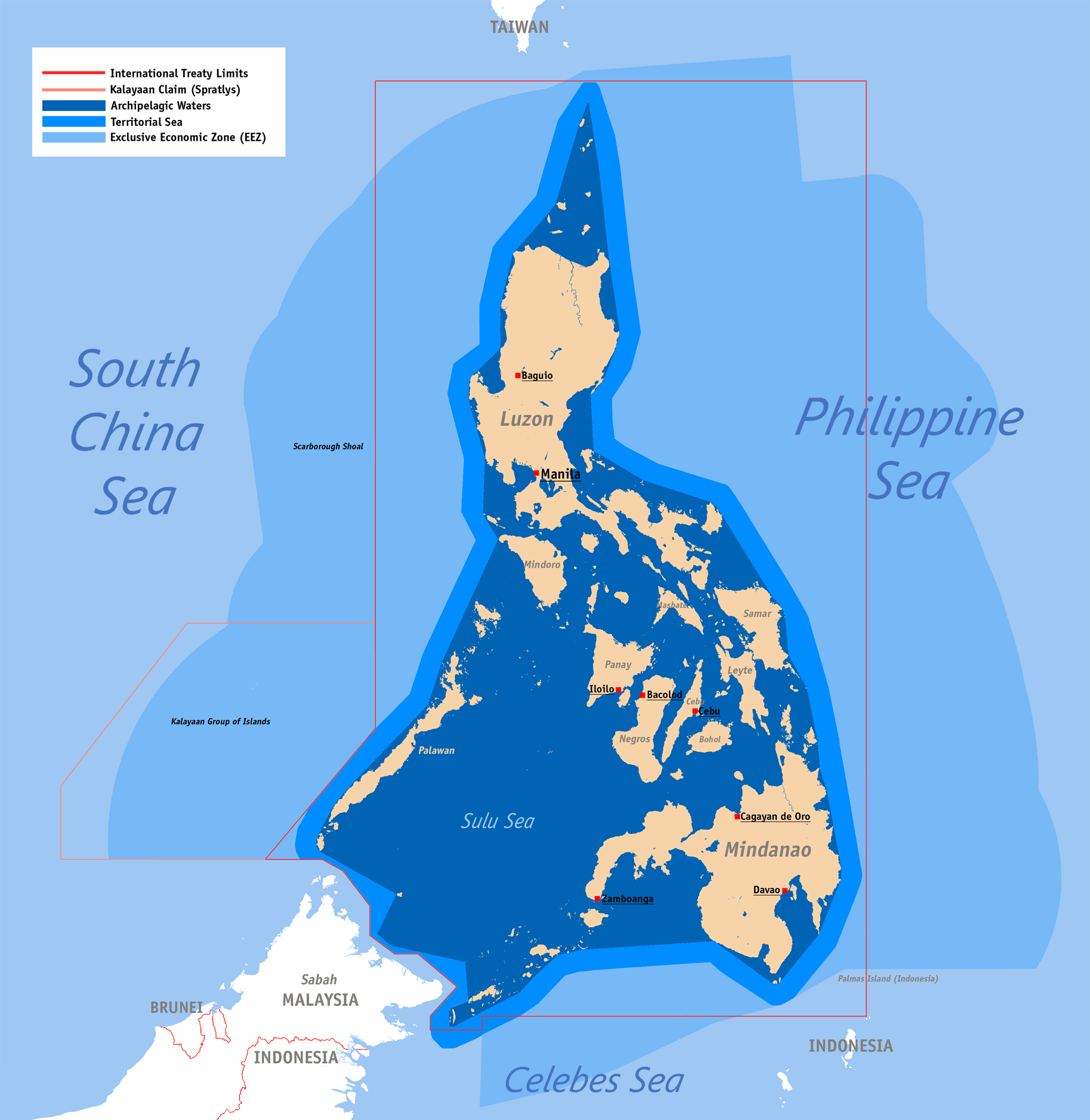
The baselines of the Philippines in darkest blue

The baselines of the Philippines (Filipino: mga batayang-guhit ng Pilipinas) are the set of straight baselines encircling the Philippine archipelago from which the country's maritime entitlements are measured. The baselines were first established in 1961 through an act of Congress, and were later amended in April 2009 to conform with the United Nations Convention on the Law of the Sea (UNCLOS), to which the Philippines is a signatory. A total of 101 basepoints defining 100 baselines were identified under Republic Act No. 9522, which designated Mavulis Island as the northernmost point, Frances Reef as the southernmost, Pusan Point as the easternmost, and Mangsee Great (Coycoy) Reef as the westernmost point of the main Philippine archipelago.

== Background ==
The Philippines is an archipelago of 7,641 islands customarily enclosed by the lines demarcated by the Treaty of Paris in 1898 and its supplementary Treaty of Washington of 1900, and the Convention Between the United States and Great Britain in 1930, which came to be known in the Philippines as its International Treaty Limits. The government of the Philippines has maintained its position that the waters enclosed by the demarcation lines in the said treaties form part of its territorial waters regardless of its breadth and dimension.

== Baselines ==
The geographic coordinates below are referenced to the World Geodetic System 1984.

| Basepoint number | Station name | Location | Province | Latitude (N) | Longitude (E) | Distance to next basepoint | | |
| | | | | | | nmi | km | mi |
|---|---|---|---|---|---|---|---|---|
| 1 | PAB-01 | Amianan Island | Batanes | 21° 6′ 57.73″ | 121° 57′ 27.71″ | 70.03 | 129.70 | 80.59 |
| 2 | PAB-02 | Balintang Island | Cagayan | 19° 57′ 38.19″ | 122° 9′ 46.32″ | 99.17 | 183.66 | 114.12 |
| 3 | PAB-04 | Iligan Point | Cagayan | 18° 18′ 35.30″ | 122° 20′ 19.07″ | 71.83 | 133.03 | 82.66 |
| 4 | PAB-05A | Ditolong Point | Isabela | 17° 7′ 16.30″ | 122° 31′ 28.34″ | 1.05 | 1.94 | 1.21 |
| 5 | PAB-05B | Ditolong Point | Isabela | 17° 6′ 14.79″ | 122° 31′ 43.84″ | 0.39 | 0.72 | 0.45 |
| 6 | PAB-05 | Ditolong Point | Isabela | 17° 5′ 51.31″ | 122° 31′ 42.66″ | 3.29 | 6.09 | 3.79 |
| 7 | PAB-06 | Spires Island | Isabela | 17° 2′ 36.91″ | 122° 31′ 3.28″ | 9.74 | 18.04 | 11.21 |
| 8 | PAB-06B | Digollorin Point | Isabela | 16° 53′ 18.03″ | 122° 27′ 56.61″ | 3.51 | 6.50 | 4.04 |
| 9 | PAB-06C | Digollorin Rock | Isabela | 16° 49′ 56.11″ | 122° 26′ 50.78″ | 2.40 | 4.44 | 2.76 |
| 10 | PAB-07 | Diviuisa Point | Isabela | 16° 47′ 38.86″ | 122° 26′ 4.40″ | 30.94 | 57.30 | 35.61 |
| 11 | PAB-08 | Dijohan Point | Aurora | 16° 18′ 44.33″ | 122° 14′ 16.69″ | 116.26 | 215.31 | 133.79 |
| 12 | PAB-10A | Tinaga Island | Camarines Norte | 14° 29′ 54.43″ | 122° 57′ 51.15″ | 80.29 | 148.70 | 92.40 |
| 13 | PAB-11 | Horodaba Rock | Catanduanes | 14° 6′ 29.91″ | 124° 16′ 59.21″ | 0.54 | 1.00 | 0.62 |
| 14 | PAB-12 | Matulin Rock | Catanduanes | 14° 6′ 10.40″ | 124° 17′ 26.28″ | 96.04 | 177.87 | 110.52 |
| 15 | PAB-13 | Atalaya Point | Northern Samar | 12° 41′ 6.37″ | 125° 3′ 53.71″ | 6.79 | 12.58 | 7.81 |
| 16 | PAB-13A | Bacan Island | Northern Samar | 12° 36′ 18.41″ | 125° 8′ 50.19″ | 5.52 | 10.22 | 6.35 |
| 17 | PAB-14 | Finch Rock | Northern Samar | 12° 32′ 33.62″ | 125° 12′ 59.70″ | 0.80 | 1.48 | 0.92 |
| 18 | PAB-14A | Cube Rock | Northern Samar | 12° 31′ 57.45″ | 125° 13′ 32.37″ | 4.90 | 9.07 | 5.64 |
| 19 | PAB-14D | NW Manjud Point | Northern Samar | 12° 28′ 36.42″ | 125° 17′ 12.32″ | 1.30 | 2.41 | 1.50 |
| 20 | PAB-15 | SE Manjud Point | Northern Samar | 12° 27′ 37.51″ | 125° 18′ 5.23″ | 7.69 | 14.24 | 8.85 |
| 21 | PAB-16A | E Sora Cay | Northern Samar | 12° 21′ 41.64″ | 125° 23′ 7.41″ | 5.68 | 10.52 | 6.54 |
| 22 | PAB-16B | Panablijon | Eastern Samar | 12° 17′ 27.17″ | 125° 27′ 0.12″ | 5.21 | 9.65 | 6.00 |
| 23 | PAB-16C | Alugon | Eastern Samar | 12° 13′ 21.95″ | 125° 30′ 19.47″ | 1.94 | 3.59 | 2.23 |
| 24 | PAB-16D | N Bunga Point | Eastern Samar | 12° 11′ 48.16″ | 125° 31′ 30.88″ | 0.54 | 1.00 | 0.62 |
| 25 | PAB-17A | E Bunga Point | Eastern Samar | 12° 11′ 20.67″ | 125° 31′ 48.29″ | 5.71 | 10.57 | 6.57 |
| 26 | PAB-18A | SE Tubabao Island | Eastern Samar | 12° 6′ 7.00″ | 125° 34′ 11.94″ | 83.84 | 155.27 | 96.48 |
| 27 | PAB-19C | Suluan Island | Eastern Samar | 10° 45′ 16.70″ | 125° 58′ 8.78″ | 56.28 | 104.23 | 64.77 |
| 28 | PAB-19D | N Tuason Point | Surigao del Norte | 9° 49′ 59.58″ | 126° 10′ 6.39″ | 57.44 | 106.38 | 66.10 |
| 29 | PAB-20A | Arangasa Island | Surigao del Sur | 8° 53′ 16.62″ | 126° 20′ 48.81″ | 40.69 | 75.36 | 46.83 |
| 30 | PAB-21B | Sanco Point | Surigao del Sur | 8° 13′ 11.53″ | 126° 28′ 53.25″ | 30.80 | 57.04 | 35.44 |
| 31 | PAB-22 | Bagoso Island | Davao Oriental | 7° 42′ 45.02″ | 126° 34′ 29.03″ | 12.95 | 23.98 | 14.90 |
| 32 | PAB-22C | Languyan | Davao Oriental | 7° 29′ 49.47″ | 126° 35′ 59.24″ | 0.54 | 1.00 | 0.62 |
| 33 | PAB-23 | Languyan | Davao Oriental | 7° 29′ 16.93″ | 126° 35′ 59.50″ | 0.76 | 1.41 | 0.87 |
| 34 | PAB-23B | Languyan | Davao Oriental | 7° 28′ 30.97″ | 126° 35′ 57.30″ | 1.02 | 1.89 | 1.17 |
| 35 | PAB-23C | N Baculin Point | Davao Oriental | 7° 27′ 29.42″ | 126° 35′ 51.71″ | 10.12 | 18.74 | 11.65 |
| 36 | PAB-24 | Pusan Point | Davao Oriental | 7° 17′ 19.80″ | 126° 36′ 18.16″ | 1.14 | 2.11 | 1.31 |
| 37 | PAB-24A | S Pusan Point | Davao Oriental | 7° 16′ 14.43″ | 126° 35′ 57.20″ | 63.28 | 117.19 | 72.82 |
| 38 | PAB-25B | Cape San Agustin | Davao Oriental | 6° 17′ 14.73″ | 126° 12′ 14.40″ | 1.28 | 2.37 | 1.47 |
| 39 | PAB-25 | Cape San Agustin | Davao Oriental | 6° 16′ 8.35″ | 126° 11′ 35.06″ | 67.65 | 125.29 | 77.85 |
| 40 | PAB-26 | SE Sarangani Island | Davao Occidental | 5° 23′ 34.20″ | 125° 28′ 42.11″ | 0.43 | 0.80 | 0.49 |
| 41 | PAB-27 | Panguil Bato Point | Davao Occidental | 5° 23′ 21.80″ | 125° 28′ 19.59″ | 3.44 | 6.37 | 3.96 |
| 42 | PAB-28 | Tapundo Point | Davao Occidental | 5° 21′ 55.66″ | 125° 25′ 11.21″ | 3.31 | 6.13 | 3.81 |
| 43 | PAB-29 | W Calia Point | Davao Occidental | 5° 21′ 58.48″ | 125° 21′ 52.03″ | 0.87 | 1.61 | 1.00 |
| 44 | PAB-30 | Manamil Island | Davao Occidental | 5° 22′ 2.91″ | 125° 20′ 59.73″ | 1.79 | 3.32 | 2.06 |
| 45 | PAB-31 | Marampog Point | Davao Occidental | 5° 23′ 20.18″ | 125° 19′ 44.29″ | 78.42 | 145.23 | 90.24 |
| 46 | PAB-32 | Pola Point | Sultan Kudarat | 6° 9′ 8.44″ | 124° 15′ 42.81″ | 122.88 | 227.57 | 141.41 |
| 47 | PAB-33A | Kauluan Island | Basilan | 6° 26′ 47.22″ | 122° 13′ 34.50″ | 29.44 | 54.52 | 33.88 |
| 48 | PAB-34A | Tongquil Island | Sulu | 6° 2′ 33.77″ | 121° 56′ 36.20″ | 2.38 | 4.41 | 2.74 |
| 49 | PAB-35 | Tongquil Island | Sulu | 6° 1′ 8.15″ | 121° 54′ 41.45″ | 1.72 | 3.19 | 1.98 |
| 50 | PAB-35A | Tongquil Island | Sulu | 6° 0′ 17.88″ | 121° 53′ 11.17″ | 85.94 | 159.16 | 98.90 |
| 51 | PAB-38A | Kinapusan Island | Tawi-Tawi | 5° 12′ 8.70″ | 120° 41′ 38.14″ | 55.24 | 102.30 | 63.57 |
| 52 | PAB-39 | Manuk Manka Island | Tawi-Tawi | 4° 47′ 39.24″ | 119° 51′ 58.08″ | 43.44 | 80.45 | 49.99 |
| 53 | PAB-40 | Frances Reef | Tawi-Tawi | 4° 24′ 53.84″ | 119° 14′ 50.71″ | 0.61 | 1.13 | 0.70 |
| 54 | PAB-40A | Frances Reef | Tawi-Tawi | 4° 25′ 3.83″ | 119° 14′ 15.15″ | 15.48 | 28.67 | 17.81 |
| 55 | PAB-41A | Bajapa Reef | Tawi-Tawi | 4° 36′ 9.01″ | 119° 3′ 22.75″ | 6.88 | 12.74 | 7.92 |
| 56 | PAB-42A | Paguan Island | Tawi-Tawi | 4° 42′ 52.07″ | 119° 1′ 44.04″ | 3.40 | 6.30 | 3.91 |
| 57 | PAB-43 | Alice Reef | Tawi-Tawi | 4° 45′ 55.25″ | 119° 3′ 15.19″ | 2.28 | 4.22 | 2.62 |
| 58 | PAB-44 | Alice Reef | Tawi-Tawi | 4° 47′ 5.36″ | 119° 5′ 12.94″ | 18.60 | 34.45 | 21.40 |
| 59 | PAB-45 | Omapoy Rock | Tawi-Tawi | 4° 55′ 10.45″ | 119° 22′ 1.30″ | 23.37 | 43.28 | 26.89 |
| 60 | PAB-46 | Bukut Lapis Point | Tawi-Tawi | 5° 2′ 23.73″ | 119° 44′ 18.14″ | 44.20 | 81.86 | 50.86 |
| 61 | PAB-47 | Pearl Bank | Sulu | 5° 46′ 35.15″ | 119° 39′ 51.77″ | 75.17 | 139.21 | 86.50 |
| 62 | PAB-48 | Baguan Island | Tawi-Tawi | 6° 5′ 58.41″ | 118° 26′ 57.30″ | 8.54 | 15.82 | 9.83 |
| 63 | PAB-48A | Taganak Island | Tawi-Tawi | 6° 4′ 14.08″ | 118° 18′ 33.33″ | 13.46 | 24.93 | 15.49 |
| 64 | PAB-49 | Great Bakkungaan Island | Tawi-Tawi | 6° 11′ 4.65″ | 118° 6′ 54.15″ | 3.97 | 7.35 | 4.57 |
| 65 | PAB-50 | Lihiman Island | Tawi-Tawi | 6° 13′ 39.90″ | 118° 3′ 52.09″ | 5.53 | 10.24 | 6.36 |
| 66 | PAB-51 | Sibaung Island | Tawi-Tawi | 6° 17′ 43.99″ | 118° 0′ 5.44″ | 41.60 | 77.04 | 47.87 |
| 67 | PAB-52 | Muligi Island | Tawi-Tawi | 6° 52′ 14.53″ | 118° 23′ 40.49″ | 75.06 | 139.01 | 86.38 |
| 68 | PAB-53 | South Mangsee Island | Palawan | 7° 30′ 26.05″ | 117° 18′ 33.75″ | 26 | 48.15 | 29.92 |
| 69 | PAB-54 | Balabac Island | Palawan | 7° 48′ 30.69″ | 116° 59′ 39.18″ | 6.08 | 11.26 | 7.00 |
| 70 | PAB-54A | Balabac Great Reef | Palawan | 7° 51′ 27.17″ | 116° 54′ 17.19″ | 1.18 | 2.19 | 1.36 |
| 71 | PAB-54B | Balabac Great Reef | Palawan | 7° 52′ 19.86″ | 116° 53′ 28.73″ | 2.27 | 4.20 | 2.61 |
| 72 | PAB-55 | Balabac Great Reef | Palawan | 7° 54′ 36.35″ | 116° 53′ 16.64″ | 7.42 | 13.74 | 8.54 |
| 73 | PAB-60 | Ada Reef | Palawan | 8° 2′ 0.26″ | 116° 54′ 10.04″ | 10.85 | 20.09 | 12.49 |
| 74 | PAB-61 | Secam Island | Palawan | 8° 11′ 18.36″ | 116° 59′ 51.87″ | 30.88 | 57.19 | 35.54 |
| 75 | PAB-62 | Latud Point | Palawan | 8° 37′ 56.37″ | 117° 15′ 51.23″ | 7.91 | 14.65 | 9.10 |
| 76 | PAB-63 | SW Tatub Point | Palawan | 8° 44′ 17.40″ | 117° 20′ 39.37″ | 11.89 | 22.02 | 13.68 |
| 77 | PAB-63A | W Sicud Point | Palawan | 8° 53′ 32.20″ | 117° 28′ 15.78″ | 13.20 | 24.45 | 15.19 |
| 78 | PAB-64 | Tarumpitao Point | Palawan | 9° 2′ 57.47″ | 117° 37′ 38.88″ | 81.12 | 150.23 | 93.35 |
| 79 | PAB-64B | Dry Island | Palawan | 9° 59′ 22.54″ | 118° 36′ 53.61″ | 82.76 | 153.27 | 95.24 |
| 80 | PAB-65C | Binangcolan Point | Palawan | 11° 13′ 19.82″ | 119° 15′ 17.74″ | 74.65 | 138.25 | 85.91 |
| 81 | PAB-67 | Pinnacle Rock | Palawan | 12° 19′ 35.22″ | 119° 50′ 56.00″ | 93.88 | 173.87 | 108.04 |
| 82 | PAB-68 | Cabra Island | Occidental Mindoro | 13° 53′ 21.45″ | 120° 1′ 5.86″ | 115.69 | 214.26 | 133.13 |
| 83 | PAB-71 | Hermana Mayor Island | Zambales | 15° 48′ 43.61″ | 119° 46′ 56.09″ | 9.30 | 17.22 | 10.70 |
| 84 | PAB-72 | Tambobo Point | Pangasinan | 15° 57′ 51.67″ | 119° 44′ 55.32″ | 12.06 | 22.34 | 13.88 |
| 85 | PAB-73B | Rena Point | Pangasinan | 16° 9′ 57.90″ | 119° 45′ 15.76″ | 0.25 | 0.46 | 0.29 |
| 86 | PAB-73 | Rena Point | Pangasinan | 16° 10′ 12.42″ | 119° 45′ 11.95 | 6.43 | 11.91 | 7.40 |
| 87 | PAB-74 | Rocky Ledge | Pangasinan | 16° 16′ 34.46″ | 119° 46′ 19.50″ | 0.65 | 1.20 | 0.75 |
| 88 | PAB-74A | Piedra Point | Pangasinan | 16° 17′ 12.70″ | 119° 46′ 28.52″ | 1.30 | 2.41 | 1.50 |
| 89 | PAB-75 | Piedra Point | Pangasinan | 16° 18′ 29.49″ | 119° 46′ 44.94″ | 1.04 | 1.93 | 1.20 |
| 90 | PAB-75C | Piedra Point | Pangasinan | 16° 19′ 28.20″ | 119° 47′ 7.69″ | 0.63 | 1.17 | 0.72 |
| 91 | PAB-75D | Piedra Point | Pangasinan | 16° 20′ 4.38″ | 119° 47′ 20.48″ | 80.60 | 149.27 | 92.75 |
| 92 | PAB-76 | Dile Point | Ilocos Sur | 17° 34′ 24.94″ | 120° 20′ 33.36″ | 6.86 | 12.70 | 7.89 |
| 93 | PAB-77 | Pinget Island | Ilocos Sur | 17° 41′ 17.56″ | 120° 21′ 2.02″ | 14.15 | 26.21 | 16.28 |
| 94 | PAB-78 | Badoc Island | Ilocos Norte | 17° 55′ 4.13″ | 120° 24′ 40.56″ | 35.40 | 65.56 | 40.74 |
| 95 | PAB-79 | Cape Bojeador | Ilocos Norte | 18° 29′ 32.42″ | 120° 33′ 42.41″ | 1.77 | 3.28 | 2.04 |
| 96 | PAB-79B | Bobon | Ilocos Norte | 18° 30′ 52.88″ | 120° 34′ 55.35″ | 53.23 | 98.58 | 61.26 |
| 97 | PAB-80 | Calagangan Point | Cagayan | 19° 10′ 14.78″ | 121° 12′ 52.64″ | 98.07 | 181.63 | 112.86 |
| 98 | PAB-82 | Itbayat Island | Batanes | 20° 43′ 15.74″ | 121° 46′ 57.80″ | 25.63 | 47.47 | 29.49 |
| 99 | PAB-83 | Amianan Island | Batanes | 21° 7′ 17.47″ | 121° 56′ 43.85″ | 0.08 | 0.15 | 0.09 |
| 100 | PAB-84 | Amianan Island | Batanes | 21° 7′ 18.41″ | 121° 56′ 48.79″ | 0.25 | 0.46 | 0.29 |
| 101 | PAB-85 | Amianan Island | Batanes | 21° 7′ 12.04″ | 121° 57′ 3.65″ | 0.44 | 0.81 | 0.51 |

== See also ==
- Extreme points of the Philippines
