= List of headlands of the Philippines =

A headland is a point of land extending into the sea. The Philippines, being an archipelagic country of 7,641 islands, is surrounded by several bodies of water and has many headlands. Headlands around the Philippine coast are most commonly named as 'point' (punta), 'cape' (cabo) or sometimes 'head'.

== Luzon ==
=== Aurora ===
- Agria Point
- Baler Point
- Bunga Point
- Cape Encanto
- Cape San Ildefonso
- Debutunan Point
- Delgada Point
- Diatorin Point
- Dicapanikian Point
- Dicapanisan Point
- Dijohan Point
- Disucsip Point
- Otpegon Point
- Salaysay Point
- Tarigit Point

=== Bataan ===
- Alasasin Point
- Amo Point
- Binanga Point
- Caibobo Point
- Cochinos Point
- Cubi Point
- Eman Point
- Hornos Point
- Lamao Point
- Latain Point
- Lucanin Point
- Luzon Point
- Mapalan Point
- Napot Point
- Pandan Point
- Panibatujan Point
- Pubulusan Point
- Quinauan Point
- Real Point
- Salamang Point
- San Jose Point
- Saysain Point
- Vigia Point

=== Batanes ===
- Ahau Point
- Radinan Point

=== Batangas ===
- Arenas Point
- Bagalangit Point
- Bantigue Point
- Bayanan Point
- Bocboc Point
- Borijar Point
- Buaya Point
- Cape Santiago
- Cazador Point
- Dalig Point
- Fuego Point
- Gorda Point
- Jamilo Point
- Lian Point
- Ligpo Point
- Locloc Point
- Malabrigo Point
- Malagundi Point
- Matoco Point
- Nasugbu Point
- Palo Bandera Point
- Punas Point
- San Diego Point
- San Pedrino Point
- Sepoc Point
- Subukin Point
- Talin Point

=== Cagayan ===
- Amunitan Point
- Baguio Point
- Baketbaket Point
- Batang Point
- Bolos Point
- Cabutunan Point
- Cagahan Point
- Calacongan Point
- Calansan Point
- Canaguing Point
- Cape Engaño
- Carinatan Point
- Catanapan Point
- Centinela Point
- Escarpada Point
- Gosangan Point
- Labig Point
- Lacaylacay Point
- Laton Point
- Linao Point
- Lobod Point
- Lokgok Point
- Malolog Point
- Matara Point
- Nagayaman Point
- Naglocsaden Point
- Nagsidel Point
- Nanandatan Point
- Nanisetan Point
- Naragatan Point
- Ninauan Point
- Panamahan Point
- Panti Point
- Pata Point
- Piddan Point
- Pine Point
- Piton Point
- Puac Point
- Sujiguian Point
- Taboan Point
- Tucaleg Point
- Tumulod Point
- Valleyhead

=== Camarines Norte ===
- Bacacay Point
- Banban Point
- Grove Point
- High Point
- Indan Point
- Jesus Point
- Mapingil Point
- Poctol Point
- Pulandaga Point
- Sagbungon Point
- Tanoban Point

=== Camarines Sur ===
- Dagdagen Point
- Quinabucasan Point
- Sapenitan Point

=== Catanduanes ===
- Agojo Point
- Balangona Point
- Nagumbuaya Point
- Sialat Point
- Virac Point
- Yog Point

=== Cavite ===
- Cape Corregidor
- Limit Point
- Maragondon Point
- Restinga Point
- Sangley Point

=== Ilocos Norte ===
- Blanca Point
- Burayoc Point
- Cape Bojeador
- Culili Point
- Gabot Point
- Lugot Point
- Mairaira Point
- Negra Point
- Solot Point
- Sugiab Point

=== Ilocos Sur ===
- Solvec Point
- Tamurung Point

=== Isabela ===
- Apaya Point North
- Apaya Point South
- Demacnat Point
- Digollorin Point
- Dikahitibitan Point
- Dikinamaran Point
- Dilacnadanom Point
- Dinapigue Point
- Dinatadmo Point
- Disumangit Point
- Ditolong Point
- Ditungawan Point
- Diviuisa Point
- Kanhansan Point
- Maconacon Point
- Masalansan Point
- Palanan Point

=== La Union ===
- Aringay Point
- Bauang Point
- Darigayas Point
- Poro Point

=== Marinduque ===
- Banuoro Point
- Cabuyo Point
- Cagpoc Point
- Gatala Point
- Lupac Point
- Marlanga Point
- Metati Point
- Obung Point
- Panique Point
- Salomaque Point
- Suban Point

=== Masbate ===
- Aguja Point
- Bagabayod Point
- Bagubaut Point
- Bagupantao Point
- Balaboa Point
- Bangkay Point
- Bugui Point
- Buyo Point
- Colorado Point
- Kibuaya Point
- Lucaria Point
- Mabata Point
- Madanlog Point
- Malapingan Point
- Managaysay Point
- Mariveles Point
- Matalan Point
- Matungog Point
- Northwest Point
- Pagbulungan Point
- Pulanduta Point
- Sagausauan Point
- Salipef Point
- San Rafael Point
- Tasiran Point
- Tres Marias Point

=== Mindoro ===
- Antipola Point
- Antucao Point
- Bagalayag Point
- Balingawan Point
- Binarera Point
- Cabug Point
- Calapan Point
- Calinsungan Point
- Cape Calavite
- Colasi Point
- Cumalog Point
- Dayhagan Point
- Del Monte Point
- Escarceo Point
- Ganting Point
- Igsoso Point
- Itbu Point
- Kalawit Point
- Lawilawi Point
- Lugta Point
- Mahaba Point
- Manog Point
- Mansiol Point
- Natalon Point
- Palapag Point
- Pantocomi Point
- Pauican Point
- Pinagdagatan Point
- Quebrada Point
- Sala Point
- Salangan Point
- Tabasi Point
- Tambi Point
- Tanawan Point
- Tubile Point
- Tumbuga Point

=== Palawan ===
- Abrupt Point
- Albion Head
- Alimudin Point
- Amalingat Point
- Amianan Point
- Anepahan Point
- Apaopurewan Point
- Arton Point
- Atog Point
- Baboy Daraga Point
- Bacao Point
- Bagman Point
- Bagtasan Point
- Bahia Honda Point
- Baja Point
- Balabuan Point
- Balaganon Point
- Balintang Point
- Baliog Point
- Balolo Point
- Bancabancao Point
- Banisi Point
- Bantigue Point
- Barbacan Point
- Baringbaring Point
- Barranca Point
- Bato-Bato Point
- Bay Point
- Bigaongan Point
- Binangculan Point
- Binayan Point
- Binga Point
- Binoong Point
- Bivouac Point
- Biyalaso Point
- Black Rock Point
- Bluff Point
- Bobosawen Point
- Bocao Point
- Bokal Point
- Bokbok Point
- Bold Head
- Bolotoc Point
- Broughton Point
- Bububulavan Point
- Bulawan Point
- Bullock Point
- Bulybarco Point
- Cabugao Point
- Cabuli Point
- Cagpasla Point
- Calasag Point
- Calis Point
- Calitan Point
- Calungan Point
- Calver Point
- Calwan Point
- Campanario Point
- Candawaga Point
- Capal Point
- Capangdanan Point
- Cape Buliluyan
- Cape Copoas
- Cape Disaster
- Cape Melville
- Cape Ross
- Caramay Point
- Caydalongdong Point
- Chichiboan Point
- Claudio Point
- Cliff Head
- Cliff Point
- Corot Point
- Crawford Point
- Cudugman Point
- Custodio Point
- Cutter Point
- Dagali Point
- Dalaganen Point
- Darocotan Point
- Decepcion Point
- Diente Point
- Difficult Point
- Dilarog Point
- Doro Point
- Dumaran Point
- Emergency Point
- Encampment Point
- Enterprise Point
- Eran Point
- Erawan Point
- Estuerzo Point
- Eustacia Point
- Flechas Point
- Gawit Point
- Gordo Point
- Green Head
- Hummock Point
- Igbars Point
- Iglesia Point
- Inipilan Point
- Inlulutoc Head
- Inobian Point
- Ipil Point
- Itaytay Point
- Kababoan Point
- Kabayosoan Point
- Kalempasayaoen Point
- Kamkitan Point
- Kaydungon Point
- Kaymamaon Point
- Lade Point
- Lambawang Point
- Laposlapos Point
- Lasang Point
- Leget Point
- Libro Point
- Ligas Point
- Limbangan Point
- Lock Point
- Locot Point
- Long Point
- Los Angeles Point
- Lotong Point
- Maasin Point
- Mabao Point
- Macorabo Point
- Madrepora Point
- Maduldulon Point
- Magtaolap Point
- Malalotoy Point
- Manabori Point
- Manas Point
- Mandalala Point
- Mantaya Point
- Manuduc Point
- Mapola Point
- Maranog Point
- Marantow Point
- Matagarien Point
- Matolaroc Point
- McLean Point
- Minagas Point
- Moorsom Point
- Moro Point
- Muslog Point
- Nagbarongas Point
- Naglieg Point
- Nagsaliang Point
- Nagsuagsuag Point
- Native Point
- North Point
- Northwest Head
- Pagananen Point
- Pagdanan Point
- Pagdurianan Point
- Pamaalan Point
- Pampoten Point
- Panacan Point
- Panagtaran Point
- Panaguman Point
- Panagurian Point
- Pancol Point
- Panganakan Point
- Pangyawan Point
- Panimusan Point
- Paodat Point
- Patuyo Point
- Peaked Point
- Penakbacican Point
- Penascosa Point
- Pescado Point
- Petes Point
- Piawi Point
- Piedras Point
- Pinos Point
- Pirata Head
- Poapoyan Point
- Providencia Point
- Punagis Point
- Putos Point
- Quenanamatan Point
- Rawnsley Point
- Relief Point
- Reminwang Point
- Reposo Point
- Rocky Point
- Sabuagan Point
- Sagasa Point
- Sagboyin Point
- Saint John Point
- Sambulawan Point
- Sarmiento Point
- Sciale Point
- Scott Point
- Seamer Point
- Separation Point
- Seribillas Point
- Shirt Point
- Sicud Point
- Sidsid Point
- Signal Head
- Sinbitan Point
- Sir James Brooke Point
- Sopioton Point
- Squall Point
- Steep Point
- Suri Point
- Tagbarungis Point
- Tagpan Point
- Tagpasek Point
- Tami Point
- Tandol Saleng Point
- Tangdol Point
- Taradungan Point
- Taritip Point
- Tarong Point
- Tarumpitao Point
- Tatahacan Point
- Tatan Juan Point
- Thumb Point
- Timbagnan Point
- Tingawan Point
- Tinugpan Point
- Tomba Point
- Townseed Point
- Treacher Point
- Tuluran Point
- Tumarbong Point
- Tuturinguen Point
- Wawa Point
- Wayway Point
- Welcome Point
- Wreck Head

=== Pangasinan ===
- Balingasay Point
- Bani Point
- Barani Point
- Caiman Point
- Cape Bolinao
- Payiban Point
- Reyna Point
- Tondul Point
- Toritori Point

=== Quezon ===
- Abuigoin Point
- Anavan Paquen Point
- Anibong Point
- Arena Point
- Bahay Point
- Banla Point
- Binaba Point
- Binangonan Point
- Bislian Point
- Bondoc Point
- Bubuluagan Point
- Bucao Point
- Caluba Point
- Capuluan Point
- Dait Point
- Dapdap Point
- Dayap Point
- Deseada Point
- Dinahican Point
- Gabriel Point
- Gerardo Point
- Gorda Point
- Juaya Point
- Kalobagus Point
- Kinabalian Point
- Laguio Point
- Lainlaingan Point
- Mabia Point
- Macabuyan Point
- Magierung Point
- Maguigtig Point
- Malagas Point
- Malanhog Point
- Malatandan Point
- Malazor Point
- Marcelino Point
- Nelocsoan Point
- Pagsanhan Point
- Pala Point
- Pangao Point
- Pedro Point
- Pinacapulan Point
- Pinagkamalingnan Point
- Prueba Point
- Pusgo Point
- Quidadanom Point
- Round Point
- Salanga Point
- Saley Point
- Salipsip Point
- Sampitan Point
- Sandoval Point
- Sangirin Point
- Silangan Point
- Tablas Point
- Tacligan Point
- Tungao Point
- Tuquian Point
- Ulalikan Point

=== Romblon ===
- Agnay Point
- Agutay Point
- Alfonso Point
- Angas Point
- Apunan Point
- Bangar Point
- Big Billat Point
- Bitaogan Point
- Bonbon Point
- Bulucabi Point
- Cabacongan Point
- Cabadiangna Point
- Cabalian Point
- Cabatungan Point
- Calabago Point
- Calaton Point
- Canapiag Point
- Canduyong Point
- Canloay Point
- Canuncag Point
- Capid Point
- Cauit Point
- Culis Point
- Diablo Point
- Gorda Point
- Goto Point
- Guinawayan Point
- Hinaguman Point
- Kapilejan Point
- Lapuslapus Point
- Lauan Point
- Lintihan Point
- Maabang Point
- Matutuna Point
- Nabagbagan Point
- Nabutahan Point
- Panas Point
- Pasilagon Point
- Pinamang-an Point
- Pitogo Point
- Puyo Point
- San Martin Point
- San Pedro Point
- Sangilan Point
- Sasaigan Point
- Sauang Point
- Suton Point
- Tinimbaan Point
- Tipolo Point
- Tunggo Point
- West Point

=== Sorsogon ===
- Agnas Point
- Bunubog Point
- Catundulan Point
- Cutcut Point
- Dumoguit Point
- Kaguyan Point
- Macuhil Point
- Padang Point
- Roja Point
- Rosa Point
- Tagiran Point
- Talagio Point
- Tawog Point

=== Zambales ===
- Alupihing Point
- Arenas Point
- Biniptican Point
- Botolan Point
- Capones Point
- Mangrove Point
- Naulo Point
- Palauig Point
- Sampaloc Point
- Santa Cruz Point

== Mindanao ==
=== Agusan del Norte ===
- Diuata Point

=== Basilan ===
- Basilan Point
- Batupare Point
- Bolodbolod Point
- Calagusang Point
- Kulibato Point
- Malanal Point
- Mangal Point
- Panducan Point
- Sahap Point
- Saroc Point

=== Compostela de Oro ===
- Bongbong Point
- Pangasinan Point
- Piso Point

=== Davao del Norte ===
- Bassa Point
- East Point
- Gili Point
- Lasang Point
- Linao Point
- Mansaca Point
- Paet Point
- Pohum Point

=== Davao del Sur ===
- Babak Point
- Banos Point
- Batulayol Point
- Bolak Point
- Bolton Point
- Bukid Point
- Caburan Point
- Calilidan Point
- Cliff Point
- Colapsin Point
- Colian Point
- Digos Point
- Dumalag Point
- Gual Point
- Kabalantian Point
- Kalbay Point
- Kulungan Point
- Lanang Point
- Lauayon Point
- Lejan Point
- Malusi Point
- Maybio Point
- Minaban Point
- Panguil Bato Point
- Quilapi Point
- Quitaly Point
- Santa Cruz Point
- Sibalatan Point
- Sigarin Point
- Tagulaya Point
- Tambalan Point
- Tambunan Point
- Tapundo Point
- Tibunan Point
- Tigulo Point
- Tinaca Point
- Tubalan Head
- Umbakanan Point

=== Davao Oriental ===
- Alisud Point
- Arena Point
- Bacul Point
- Baculin Point
- Bais Point
- Bangal Point
- Batiano Point
- Batikual Point
- Batinao Point
- Bilat Point
- Bitaogan Point
- Bobon Point
- Buan Point
- Cabayan Point
- Cape San Agustin
- Casauman Point
- Daco Point
- Duas Point
- Gorda Point
- Guanguan Point
- Kagan Point
- Kaganuhan Point
- Kanikian Point
- Lagum Point
- Lakga Point
- Lambajon Point
- Lamigan Point
- Licoc Point
- Lilisan Point
- Lima Point
- Limut Point
- Macaonan Point
- Madtuka Point
- Manaol Point
- Manduao Point
- Nagas Point
- Padada Point
- Paypay Point
- Pusan Point
- Salasala Point
- Sumlug Point
- Tacaquinay Point
- Taganilao Point
- Talisay Point
- Tambalan Point
- Tambuc Point
- Tanguip Point
- Tataidaga Point
- Tonguil Point
- Tugubun Point
- Tumadgo Point
- Yaco Point

=== Dinagat Islands ===
- Babatnon Point
- Balukaui Point
- Berrugosa Point
- Cliff Point
- Cogan Point
- Desolation Point
- Esconchada Point
- Kalanugan Point
- Kambagio Point
- Kanakuina Point
- Kanayut Point
- Kanbandon Point
- Kanhatid Point
- Kanlibud Point
- Masdang Point
- Panamauan Point
- Pelotes Point
- Penascales Point
- Peninsula Point
- Tambungan Point
- Tamoyauas Point
- Tungo Point

=== Lanao del Norte ===
- Calibon Point
- Dugolaan Point
- Palagoya Point
- Quinalang Point

=== Lanao del Sur ===
- Lapitan Point
- Matimus Point
- Tugapangan Point

=== Maguindanao ===
- Bulsan Point
- Gardoqui Point
- Kalingmomo Point
- Liess Point
- Linao Point
- Logung Point
- Manangula Point
- Marigalupa Point
- Panilisan Point
- Quidapil Point
- Tagata Point
- Talaya Point
- Tipian Point

=== Misamis Occidental ===
- Polo Point
- Punta Miray Point
- Tabu Point

=== Misamis Oriental ===
- Ampuso Point
- Bagacay Point
- Gorda Point
- Initao Point
- Macabalan Point
- Malugan Point
- Matangad Point
- Panaon Point
- Salimbal Point
- Sipaka Point
- Solavan Point
- Tacnipa Point

=== Sarangani ===
- Bato Maputi Point
- Hagdan Point
- Labu Point
- Lefa Point
- Lun Point
- Mantalakan Point
- Matil Point
- Parang Parang Point
- Sumbang Point
- Tampat Point
- Tampuan Point
- Tango Point
- Timos Point

=== South Cotabato ===
- Calumpan Point
- Dumpao Point
- Lanson Point
- London Point
- Noyan Point
- Siu Point

=== Sultan Kudarat ===
- Bacud Point
- Cadiz Point
- Macculi Point
- Maguling Point
- Malatuna Point
- Nara Point
- Pagang Point
- Palimban Point
- Pinol Point
- Pitas Point
- Pola Point
- Sangay Point
- Tuna Point

=== Sulu ===
- Baguis Point
- Bayerstock Point
- Belan Point
- Bulasan Point
- Bunga Point
- Bulitulan Point
- Cabalian Point
- Candea Point
- Caumpang Point
- Daingapic Point
- Equet Point
- Igasan Point
- Kabuayan Point
- Karangdato Point
- Lectuan Point
- Libit Point
- Mabajoc Point
- Mangalis Point
- Noble Point
- Pandanan Point
- Putic Point
- Sagui Point
- Sibalyan Point
- Silangon Point
- Sipincal Point
- Sulang Point
- Tampakan Point
- Toonpandanan Point
- Tubingantan Point
- Tuctuc Point

=== Surigao del Norte ===
- Agukan Point
- Arena Point
- Belisan Point
- Bilar Point
- Bitogan Point
- Bucas Point
- Claver Point
- Danakit Point
- Dolores Point
- Linukbang Point
- Madilao Point
- Manao Point
- Nahikan Point
- Sampetan Point
- Sharp Point
- Sili Point
- Sugbuhan Point
- Tuason Point

=== Surigao del Sur ===
- Bakulin Point
- Catarman Point
- Cawit Point
- Conceson Point
- Jobo Point
- Lamon Point
- Panisaan Point
- Sanco Point
- Tombog Point
- Tugas Point
- Umanun Point

=== Tawi-Tawi ===
- Bacung Point
- Bagut Lapit Point
- Bakalao Point
- Ballibuug Point
- Banga Point
- Hula Point
- Kalang Point
- Languyan Point
- Matos Point
- Pandapan Point
- Sibalo Point
- Sigalawang Point
- Sikaula Point
- Tampakan Point
- Tampat Point
- Tandotao Point
- Tanduduata Point
- Tavotavo Point
- Tocanhi Point
- Tong Batu Point
- Tongausang Point
- Tumindao Point
- Tungbahan Point

=== Zamboanga del Norte ===
- Bakong Point
- Balatacan Point
- Batotindoc Point
- Blanca Point
- Bulatinao Point
- Cauit Point
- Coronado Point
- Diwait Point
- Duluquin Point
- Lamboyan Point
- Limasun Point
- Lituban Point
- Mantibo Point
- Nanca Point
- Palandok Point
- Pangian Point
- Quipit Point
- Sampoak Point
- Sibalic Point
- Sibugan Point
- Sicayab Point
- Sikanan Point
- Sindangan Point
- Siraguay Point
- Tagolo Point
- Talisay Point
- Talulu Point

=== Zamboanga del Sur ===
- Alimpaya Point
- Balungisan Point
- Batorampon Point
- Caldera Point
- Cangan Point
- Carabuca Point
- Dayana Point
- Dumanquilas Point
- Flecha Point
- Gasacan Point
- Lawigan Point
- Malasugat Point
- Masulag Point
- Mudog Point
- Quiramat Point
- Sarva Point
- Seboto Point
- Taguisian Point
- Taguite Point
- Tambatan Point
- Tambulian Point
- Tongbatu Point

=== Zamboanga Sibugay ===
- Cabog Point
- Caparan Point
- Diosan Point
- Kolasihan Point
- Lambayogan Point
- Locsica Point
- Saro Point
- Silingan Point
- Tando Magalibut Point
- Ticauan Point
- Tigbucay Point

== Visayas ==
=== Biliran ===
- Agta Point
- Amambahag Point
- Camay Point
- Matunton Point
- Pawican Point
- Saban Point

=== Bohol ===
- Baluarte Point
- Cabulao Point
- Canopao Point
- Catarman Point
- Cocales Point
- Duljo Point
- Guinali Point
- Huagdan Point
- Lamanoc Point
- Libas Point
- Magtung Point
- Manga Point
- Napacao Point
- Nauco Point
- Punta Cruz Point
- Tahuruc Point

=== Cebu ===
- Aguaron Point
- Argao Point
- Badian Point
- Bagacay Point
- Bantigue Point
- Batatic Point
- Booc Point
- Bulalaqui Point
- Buntay Point
- Cayangon Point
- Cerro Point
- Copton Point
- Engaño Point
- Guiuanon Point
- Liloan Point
- Lungun Point
- Ogton Point
- Oslob Point
- Pungtud Point
- Talong Point
- Tango Point
- Tañon Point

=== Guimaras ===
- Alegria Point
- Bondulan Point
- Cabalic Point
- Cabugao Point
- Calabagnon Point
- Lusaran Point
- Malanay Point
- Morubuan Point
- Muhuy Point
- Pandan Point
- Tumanda Point

=== Leyte ===
==== Northern Leyte ====
- Baiwarie Point
- Burabud Point
- Camiris Point
- Canaguayan Point
- Cataisan Point
- Dungon Point
- Linganay Point
- Liog Point
- Panalaron Point
- Punud Point
- Rabin Point
- Talairan Point

==== Southern Leyte ====
- Amagusan Point
- Amogotada Point
- Binit Point
- Bolabola Point
- Caligangan Point
- Caniguin Point
- Catarman Point
- Catung Point
- Green Point
- Hingatungan Point
- Ilijan Point
- Liloan Point
- Mamban Point
- Pandan Point
- Salacot Point
- Sonok Point
- Taancan Point
- Taguus Point
- Tangbo Point
- Taytay Point

=== Negros ===
==== Negros Occidental ====
- Binigsian Point
- Bolila Point
- Bulubadian Point
- Buluguisan Point
- Calubcub Point
- Catmon Point
- Cocaguayan Point
- Ermita Point
- Gaas Point
- Maguiliguian Point
- Maquiquiling Point
- Matabang Point
- Matatindoc Point
- Obon Point
- Sojoton Point
- Tomonton Point

==== Negros Oriental ====
- Amlan Point
- Banlas Point
- Bonbonon Point
- Calongtalong Point
- Campoyo Point
- Canamay Point
- Cansilan Point
- Cauitan Point
- Colaquitan Point
- Dacung Bato Point
- Dumaguete Point
- Giligaon Point
- Siaton Point
- Tagay Point
- Tayasan Point
- Teca Point

=== Panay ===
==== Aklan ====
- Aclan Point

==== Antique ====
- Alimanga Point
- Bayo Point
- Dalipe Point
- Davis Point
- Jaldan Point
- Lipata Point
- Matasbaras Point
- Pasal Point
- Pucio Point
- Recordo Point
- Sigon Point
- Tabonan Point
- Talisay Point
- Tibiao Point
- Tubigan Point
- Tungao Point

==== Capiz ====
- Nailon Point
- Nipa Point

==== Iloilo ====
- Bacay Point
- Barigan Point
- Bulacaue Point
- Jaro Point
- Payong Point
- San Juan Point
- Tinigban Point
- Yan Point
- Zarraga Point

=== Samar ===
==== Eastern Samar ====
- Barapdaban Point
- Cagosoan Point
- Catawgan Point
- Colasi Point
- Coracoraan Point
- Handig Point
- Hilaba-an Point
- Hinablan Point
- Homoraon Point
- Kanaoayong Point
- Macatol Point
- Malistis Point
- Pondolon Point
- Punta Maria Point
- Sugaran Point
- Sungi Point
- Tugnug Point

==== Northern Samar ====
- Balot Point
- Banua Point
- Budog Point
- Cambia Point
- Cape Espiritu Santo
- Isoic Point
- Magaboak Point
- Pana Point
- Samuro Point
- Tinta Point
- Ulo Point

==== Western Samar ====
- Gapinis Point
- Madalanot Point

=== Siquijor ===
- Banlas Point
- Daquit Point
- Lumangkapan Point
- Minanulan Point
- Pahiton Point
- Sandugan Point
- Tonga Point

== See also ==
- Geography of the Philippines
- Outline of the Philippines
- Lighthouses in the Philippines
