= Itbayat Church =

Roman Catholic church in Batanes, Philippines

- Santa Maria de Mayan Church
- Simbahan ng Itbayat (Filipino)
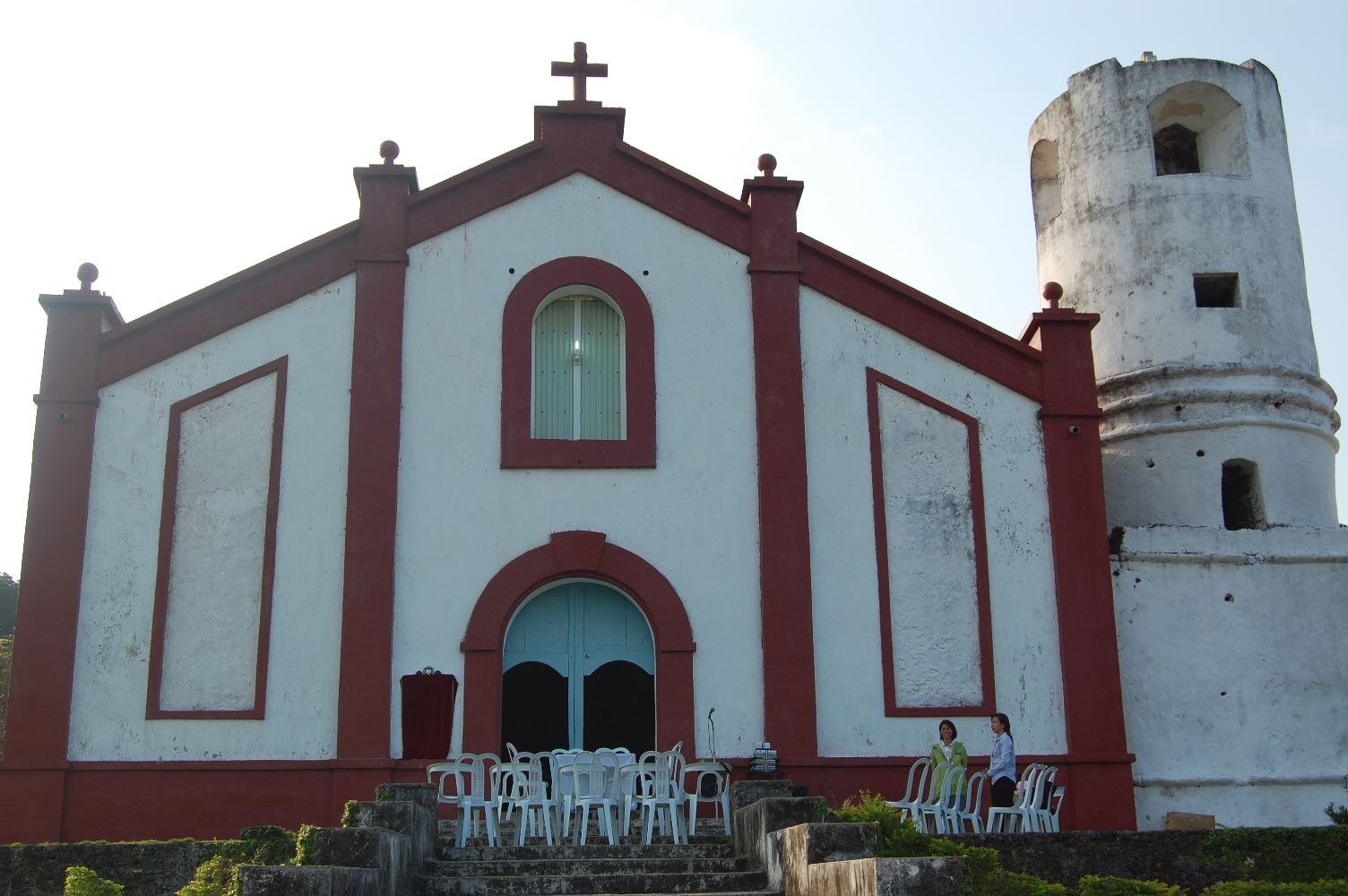
- The church prior to the 2019 earthquake

- Location in Batanes Location in Luzon Location in the Philippines
- 20°47′12″N 121°50′29″E
- Location: Itbayat, Batanes
- Country: Philippines
- Denomination: Roman Catholicism
- Religious order: Dominicans

History
- Status: Parish church
- Founded: 1853
- Dedication: Immaculate Conception

Architecture
- Years built: 1872–1888 (most recent building)
- Demolished: 2025

Administration
- Archdiocese: Tuguegarao
- Diocese: Prelature of Batanes

Clergy
- Archbishop: Ricardo Baccay
- Bishop: Danilo Ulep

Santa Maria de Mayan Parish Church, commonly known as Itbayat Church, was a historic Roman Catholic church in Itbayat, Batanes, Philippines. It was under the jurisdiction of the Territorial Prelature of Batanes.

== History ==
=== Original wooden church ===
The original structure of the Santa Maria de Mayan Church was made of wood. The original wooden church was built from 1853 to 1858 and was placed under the patronage of the Immaculate Conception.

=== Current stone church ===
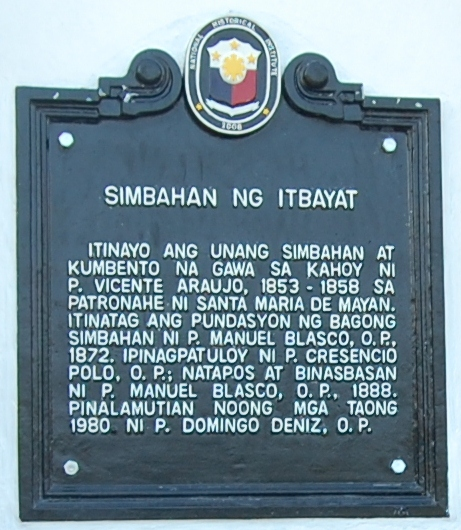
Church NHI historical marker

==== Construction ====
The current church building was built by the Dominicans. The construction of the church building was started during the administration of Fr. Manuel Blasco in 1872. It was completed in 1888 and the church was blessed by Blasco.

==== 2019 earthquake ====
The church building sustained major damage during the Batanes earthquake of July 27, 2019 with its belfry tower falling off.

==== Demolition ====
Demolition was planned on May 1, 2023 but was delayed due to legal reasons and issues concerning on heritage church conservation.

The church was further damaged by Typhoon Kong-rey (Leon) in October 2024.

The issues raised by the National Historical Commission of the Philippines (NHCP) and the National Commission for Culture and the Arts (NCCA) was resolved by August 2025 and it was concluded that the restoration of the church is not feasible. Demolition started on August 29 with plans to build a new church on the same site funded via donations.
