= Extreme points of the Philippines =

Geography of Philippines

Extreme points of the Philippines.

This is a list of points in the Philippines that are farther north, south, east, or west than any other location in the country. Also included are extreme points in elevation, extreme distances, and other points of geographic interest.

Republic Act No. 9522 of 2009, defines the archipelagic baselines of the Philippines.

== Location points ==
- Northernmost point: Mavulis (Y'Ami) Island, Itbayat, Batanes 21°7′18.41″N 121°56′48.79″E
- Southernmost point: Frances Reef, Sitangkai, Tawi-Tawi 4°24′50.00″N 119°14′50.71″E
- Southernmost island: Saluag Island, Sibutu, Tawi-Tawi 4°35′14.0″N 119°27′59.1″E
- Easternmost point: Pusan Point, Caraga, Davao Oriental 7°17′19.80″N 126°36′18.16″E
- Westernmost point (undisputed): Balabac Great Reef 7°54′36.35″N 116°53′16.64″E
- Westernmost point (disputed, claimed): Pag-asa Island, Kalayaan, Palawan 11°3′N 114°17′E

=== Cities ===
- Northernmost city: Laoag
- Southernmost city: General Santos
- Easternmost city: Bislig
- Westernmost city: Puerto Princesa

=== Luzon Island ===
- Northernmost point: Maira-ira, Pagudpud, Ilocos Norte 18°39′4.44″N 120°50′46.68″E
- Southernmost point: Bon-Ot Big, Matnog, Sorsogon 12°31′N 124°02′E

=== Mindanao Island ===
- Northernmost point: Punta Bilar, Surigao City, Surigao del Norte
- Southernmost point: Tinaca Point, Jose Abad Santos, Davao Occidental

== Altitude ==
- Highest: Mount Apo, Mindanao 2,954 meters (9,692 ft) 7°0′30″N 125°16′33″E
- Lowest: Galathea Depth, Philippine Trench, 10,540 meters (34,580 ft). It is the third-deepest in the world after the Challenger Deep, Marianas Trench (10,971 meters (35,994 ft)) and the Tonga Trench (10,882 meters (35,702 ft)).

== Highest attainable by transportation ==
- Road: Kiangan-Tinoc-Buguias Road, Eheb, Tinoc, Ifugao 2,428.66 meters (7,968.0 ft)

== See also ==
- Geography of the Philippines
