= Siayan =

Siayan may refer to places in the Philippines:

- Siayan Island
- Siayan, Zamboanga del Norte
