= Mavudis Island =

Northernmost island of the Philippines

Mavudis
Ditarem
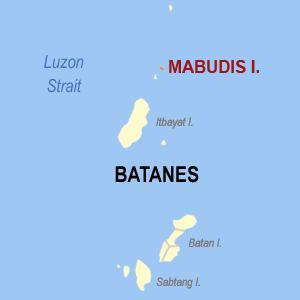
- Map of Mavudis in relation to the inhabited islands of Itbayat, Batan and Sabtang

- Location in Batanes Location in Luzon Location in Philippines
- Other name: Mabudis

Geography
- Location: Luzon Strait
- Coordinates: 20°56′00″N 121°55′00″E
- Archipelago: Batanes Group of Islands

Administration
- Philippines
- Region: Cagayan Valley
- Province: Batanes
- Municipality: Itbayat

Demographics
- Population: 0

Mavudis Island, also spelled Mabudis, is an uninhabited island of Batanes, the northernmost archipelagic province of the Philippines. It is also known as Ditarem in the native language (meaning "sharp"). It has an elevation of 204 m (669 ft) and is around 2.4 km (1.5 mi) long. The closest islands are A'li Islet, a small uninhabited islet to the west-southwest; and Siayan Island, which is about 2.4 kilometres (1.5 mi) southwest of Mavudis.

Mavudis should not be confused with Mavulis Island (Y'ami), which lies further north.

== See also ==
- List of islands of the Philippines
