= 2019 Batanes earthquake =

Natural disaster

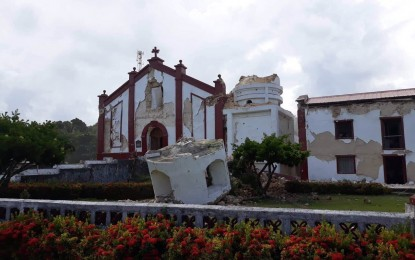
- The Itbayat Church after the earthquakes

- Location within Batanes Location within Luzon Location within Philippines
- UTC time: 2019-07-26 23:38
- ISC event: 616091865
- USGS-ANSS: ComCat
- Local date: July 27, 2019
- Local time: 07:38 PST (Philippine Standard Time)
- Magnitude: 6.0 M_{w}
- Depth: 9 km (6 mi)
- Epicenter: 20.807°N 121.986°E
- Type: Strike-slip
- Areas affected: Batanes, Philippines
- Max. intensity: PEIS VII (MMI VI)
- Tsunami: No
- Foreshocks: M_{w} 5.4
- Casualties: 9 dead, 60 injured

The 2019 Batanes earthquake was a magnitude 6.0 earthquake which struck Batanes, Philippines on July 27, 2019. It was preceded by a 5.4 magnitude foreshock. Nine people were killed by the combined effects of the earthquakes.

== Earthquake ==
The main shock of the earthquake was the 6.0 magnitude earthquake which had a depth of focus of 43 kilometers (27 mi). The Philippine Institute of Volcanology and Seismology (PHILVOLCS) earlier recorded the tectonic earthquake as a magnitude 6.4 but later revised their records. The earthquake occurred at 7:38 a.m. (UTC+8) on July 27, 2019, near Itbayat, Batanes.

A noted foreshock of the earthquake was the magnitude 5.4 earthquake which struck the same town at 4:16 a.m. (UTC+8). It had a depth of focus of 12 kilometers (7.5 mi)

One of the stronger aftershocks was a magnitude 5.8 earthquake which occurred at 9:24 a.m. (UTC+8).

== Intensity ==
According to the PHIVOLCS earthquake intensity scale, the earthquake was most felt in the town of Itbayat, Batanes at Intensity VII while the other towns of the same province reported a lesser intensity; Basco at Intensity V, Sabtang and Ivana at Intensity IV. According to the United States Geological Survey, the earthquake had a maximum intensity of VI or has caused "Strong" shaking according to the Modified Mercalli intensity scale.

Intensity of Magnitude 5.4 Earthquake Event
Intensity Scale	Location
VI	Itbayat, Batanes
IV	Basco, Ivana & Mahatao, Batanes
III	Uyugan & Sabtang, Batanes

Intensity of Magnitude 5.9 Earthquake Event
Intensity Scale	Location
VII	Itbayat, Batanes
V	Basco, Ivana & Mahatao, Batanes
IV	Uyugan & Sabtang, Batanes

No tsunami warning was raised following the main earthquake.

== Casualties and damage ==
At least 9 people were killed and 60 injured due to the earthquakes. The historic Santa Maria de Mayan Church in Itbayat, built in 1888, sustained heavy damage from the earthquake with its bell tower falling off. Several stone houses, two schools, and two health centers were also damaged.

According to the National Disaster Risk Reduction and Management Council (NDRRMC), 911 families or 2,963 individuals were affected by the earthquakes. The Department of Public Works and Highways (DPWH) on their part made an estimate that the damage caused by the earthquake costed at least ₱292 million.

== Response ==
President Rodrigo Duterte made a visit to Batanes on July 28, 2019, to personally check the situation in the province. He also made a pledge for the government to release ₱40 million for the construction of a new clinic with Duterte citing the uncertainty regarding the integrity of the still functional Itbayat District Hospital which sustained minimal cracks. Then-vice president Leni Robredo also visited the island province.

The NDRRMC also provided tents and other relief goods to people displaced due to earthquake via C-130. Other provinces and private organizations also provided aid to Batanes. The agency also shipped construction materials for new houses meant for the victims of the earthquake.

On August 1, 2019, Batanes was placed under a state of calamity.

China through its embassy in Manila donated ₱10 million as aid following the earthquake.

== See also ==
- List of earthquakes in 2019
- List of earthquakes in the Philippines
- 2019 Luzon earthquake
- 2019 Eastern Samar earthquake
- Manila Trench
- Philippine Trench
