= Bashi Channel =

Waterway between Mavulis and Orchid islands

Coordinates: 21°25′N 121°30′E

Admiralty chart of the Bashi Channel from 1925. It is the northern channel of the Luzon Strait (between Mavulis Island and Orchid Island), opposite the southern Balintang Channel.

The Bashi Channel is a waterway between Mavulis Island of the Batanes Islands, Philippines and Orchid Island of Taiwan. It is a part of the Luzon Strait, with the Philippine Sea and the Pacific Ocean to the east, and the South China Sea to the west. It is characterized by windy storms during the rainy period, which lasts from June to December.

== Etymology ==
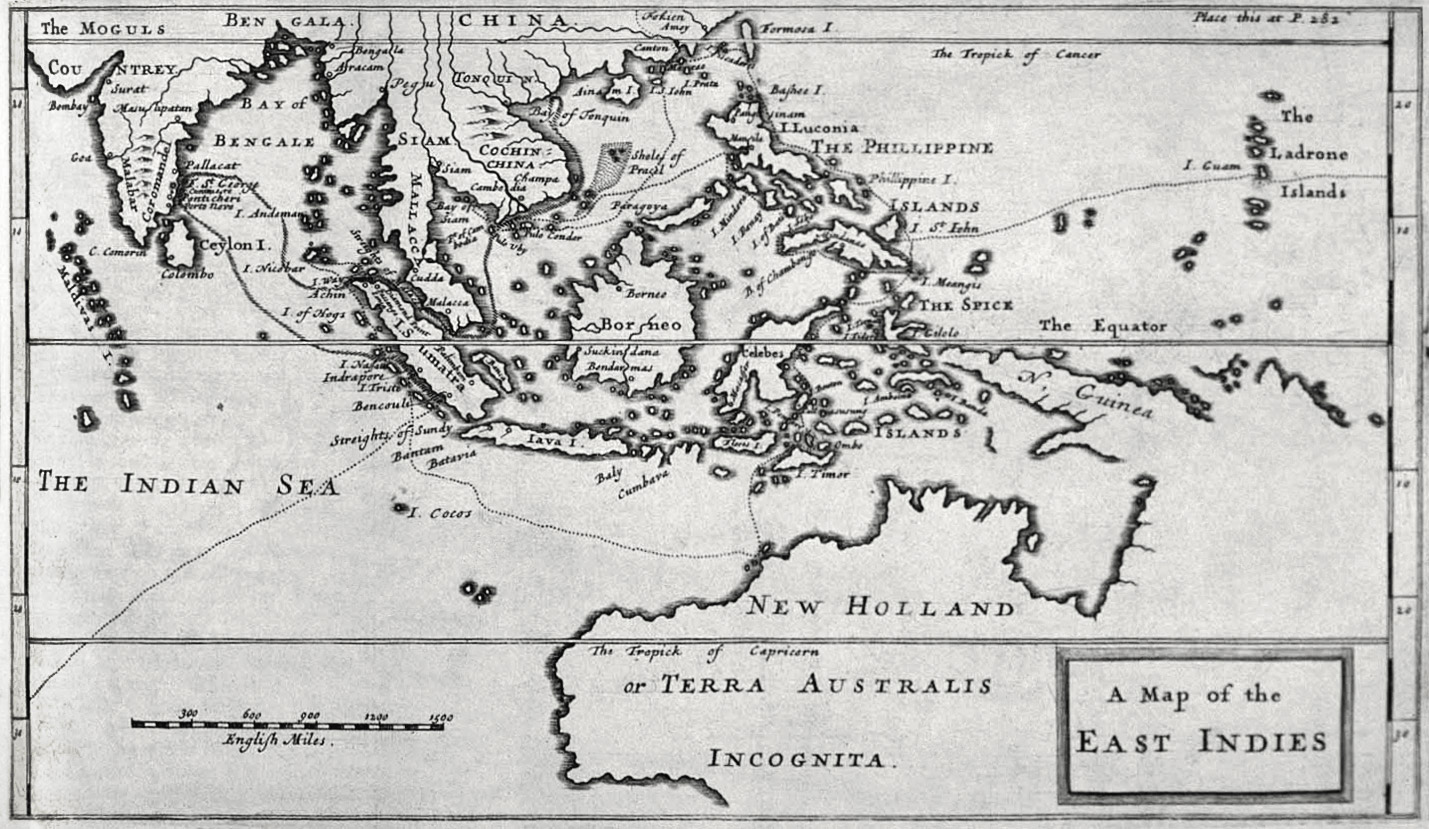
A map of the East Indies from William Dampier's New Voyage Round the World (1697), showing the "Bashee I." (Batanes Islands), the namesake of the Bashi Channel

The name "Bashi" (also spelled variously as "Basi", "Bassi", "Basy", "Baschi", "Bachi", "Bashee", and "Bachee") is from an old European name of the Batanes Islands given by the English explorer William Dampier in 1687. The name is derived from the indigenous alcoholic drink basi of the people of Northern Luzon, specifically the drink palek of the native Ivatan people of the Batanes islands.

Their common drink is water; as it is of all other Indians: Besides which they make a sort of drink with the juice of the sugar-cane, which they boil, and put some small black sort of berries among it. When it is well-boiled, they put it into great jars and it is presently fit to drink. This is an excellent liquor, and very much like English Beer, both in colour and taste. It is very strong, and I do believe very wholesome: for our men, who drank briskly of it all the day of several weeks, were frequently drunk with it, and never sick after it. The natives brought a vast deal of it every day to those aboard and ashore: for some of our men were ashore at work on Bashee Island: which island they gave that name to from their drinking this liquor there; that being the name which the natives call'd this liquor by: and as they sold it to our men, very cheap, so they did not spare to drink it as freely. And indeed from the plenty of this liquor, and their plentiful use of it, our Men call'd all these Islands, the Bashee Islands."

— William Dampier, Dampier's Voyages (1906, Vol. 1, p.424)

== Territorial dispute ==
The Bashi Channel has been disputed by Taiwan, and recently by China, due to the Treaty of Paris, entered into in 1898 by Spain and the United States, stating that "the northernmost part of Philippine territory ceded by Spain to the US ends at the 20th parallel, or south of the Balintang Channel." The Bashi Channel was not included here because original treaties signed in this period of time did not use latitude and longitude.

Despite these claims, the Bashi Channel's namesakes, the Batanes Islands, had been part of the Philippines since 1686, when the Spanish Empire first claimed them. It has been consistently included in Spanish maps (including the 1899 Atlas de Filipinas). During the American colonial period of the Philippines it was under the governorship of Otto Scheerer. By virtue of state succession and habitation, the Philippines has sovereignty of the islands, through an unbroken chain of possession from Spain to the United States and to the Philippines. Aside from the brief invasion of Imperial Japan in World War 2, neither Taiwan or China has ever exercised control of the islands or the channel.

== Purpose ==
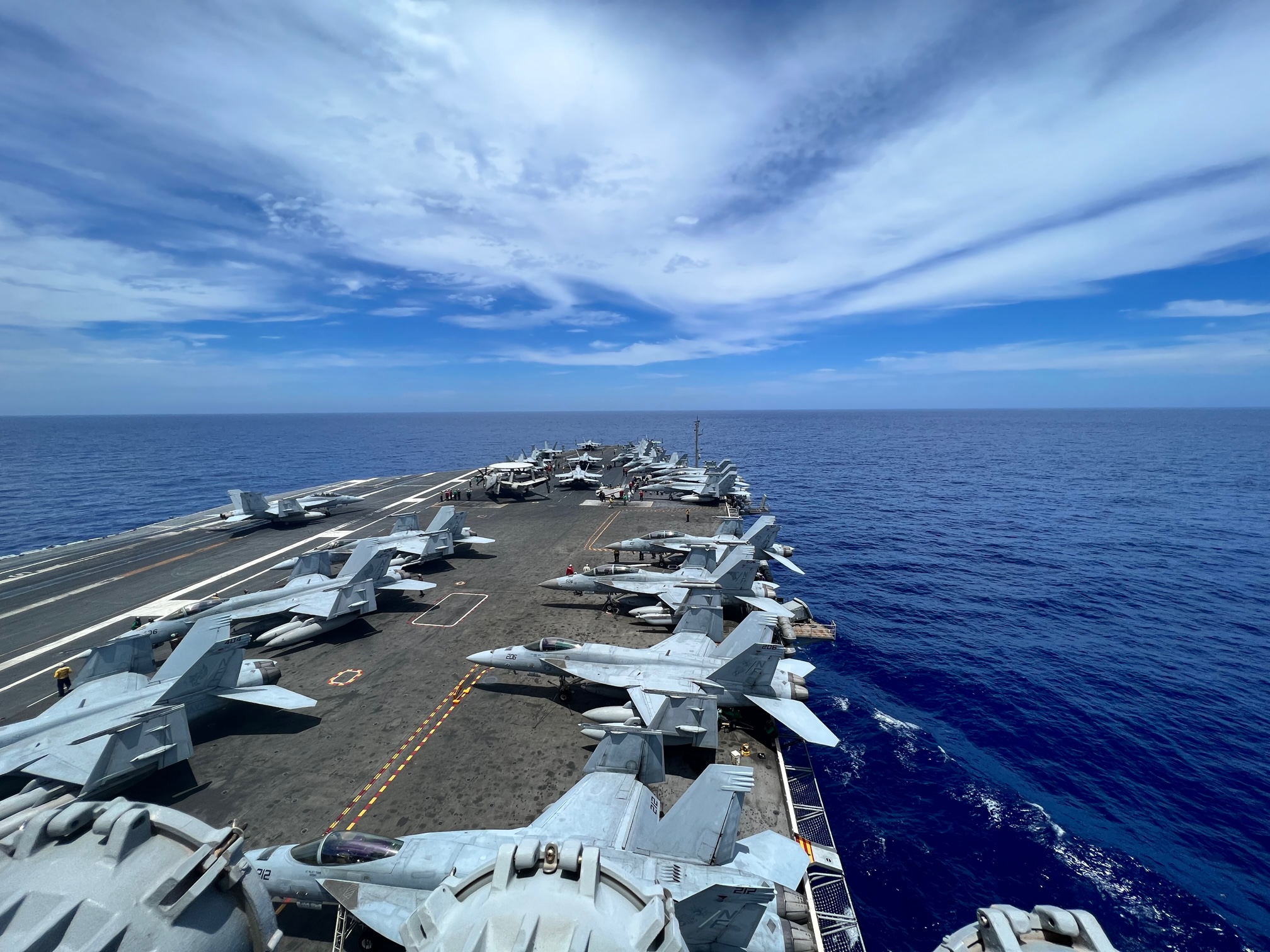
USS Ronald Reagan preparing to transit the Bashi Channel in 2024

The Bashi Channel is an important passage for military operations. The Philippines and Taiwan dispute the ownership of the waters because both sides say the region lies within 200 nautical miles (370 km; 230 mi) of their shores. The channel is also significant to communication networks. Many of the undersea communication cables that carry data and telephone traffic between Asian countries pass through the Bashi Channel, making it a major potential point of failure for the Internet. In December 2006, a magnitude 6.7 submarine earthquake cut several undersea cables at the same time, causing a significant communications bottleneck that lasted several weeks.

== See also ==
- 2006 Hengchun earthquake
- Cape Eluanbi
- Qixingyan (Taiwan)
