= Mavulis Island =

Northernmost island of the Philippines

Mavulis
Native name: Y'Ami Amianan
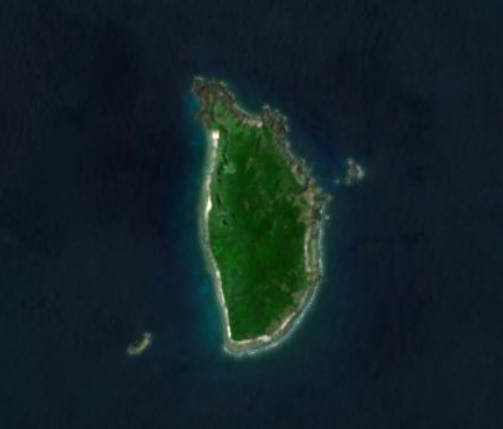
- Satellite image of the island

- Location in Batanes Location in Luzon Location in Philippines

Geography
- Location: Luzon Strait
- Coordinates: 21°6′47″N 121°57′6″E
- Archipelago: Batanes Group of Islands
- Area: 1.1 km^{2} (0.42 sq mi)

Administration
- Philippines
- Region: Cagayan Valley
- Province: Batanes
- Municipality: Itbayat

Demographics
- Population: 0

Additional information

Mavulis Island is the northernmost of the Batanes Islands and the northernmost island in the Philippines. It is part of the archipelagic province of Batanes. The island is uninhabited, but it is garrisoned by the Armed Forces of the Philippines which constructed a shelter for local fishermen, a water desalination plant, a helipad, lighthouse, and a flagpole on the top of the hill on the island considered as the northernmost flagpole in the country.

The nearest island to Mavulis is Misanga Island (also known as North Island), located 4 km (2.5 mi) to the south-southwest. Mavulis is part of the municipality of Itbayat, which is also the nearest inhabited island, located 38 km (24 mi) to the south.

== Alternative names ==
Older Batan natives also called the island Dimavulis or Dihami, meaning "north" in Ivatan. By some members of the Spanish colonial government it was called Diami, and it is known as Yami or Y'Ami on most American colonial-era maps of the Philippines. The latter should not be confused with the aboriginal Yami of Taiwan who live on islands farther north beyond Philippine territorial limits, but are geographically, culturally and linguistically related to the Ivatan people. The island is also called Amianan, meaning "north" in Ilocano.

It should not be confused with Mavudis Island (also known as Mabudis or Ditarem), which is located further south, near Siayan Island.

== Geography ==
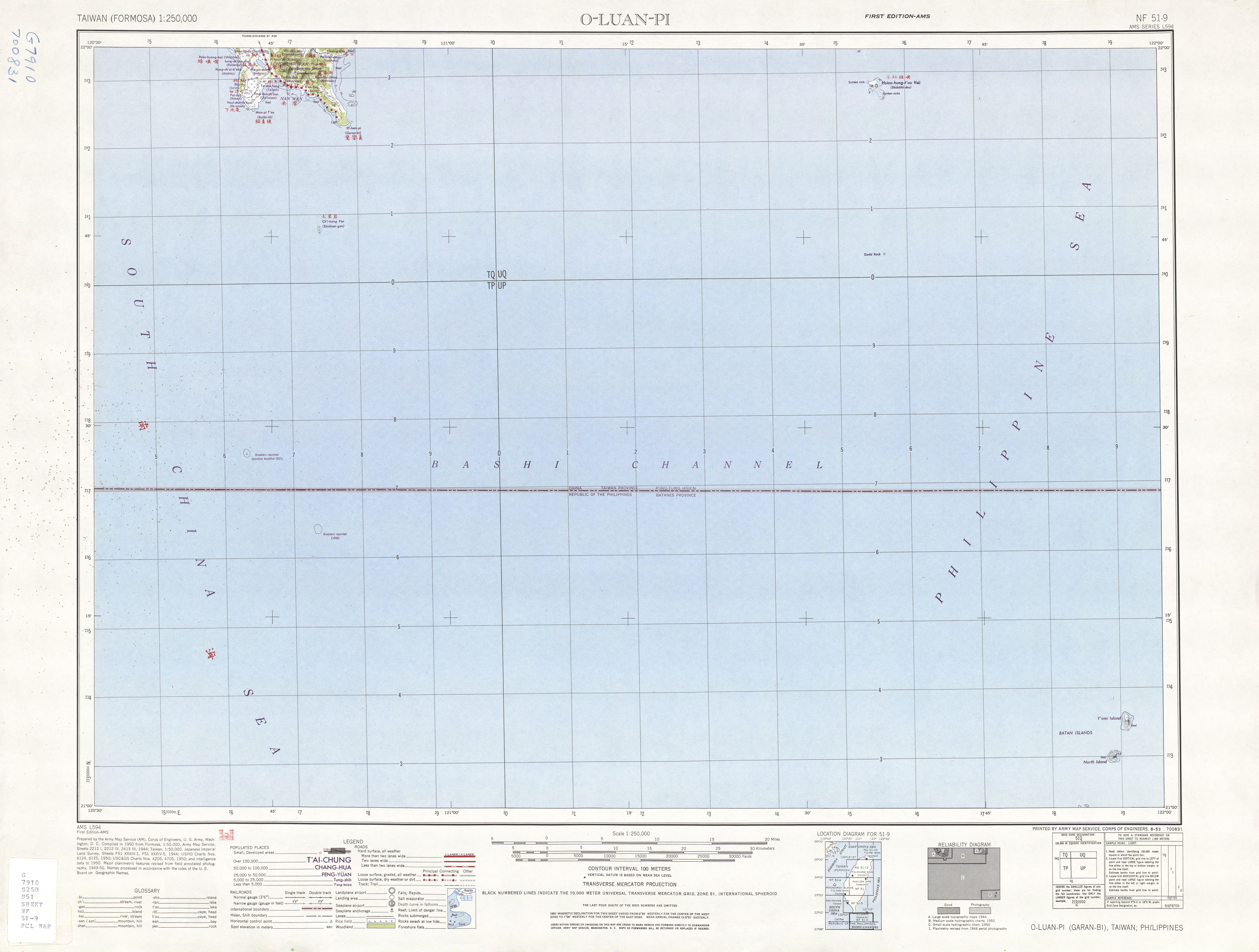
Map including Mavulis Island (labeled Y'ami Island) (AMS, 1950)

The island is part of the Luzon Volcanic Arc. The island is 2.2 km (1.4 mi) long and up to one kilometre (0.62 mi) wide. The highest point, Y'Ami Hill, is 219 metres (719 ft) high. The island is rocky on the coasts but covered in lush vegetation, including mangrove, vuyavuy palms and other native shrubs. Coconut crabs are found on the island in large numbers.

The nearest island to Mavulis is Misanga Island (also known as North Island), located 4 km (2.5 mi) to the south-southwest. Mavulis is part of the municipality of Itbayat, which is also the nearest inhabited island, located 38 km (24 mi) to the south.

Mavulis Island is closer to the Taiwanese mainland than the Philippine mainland of Luzon. The southernmost point of Taiwan Cape Eluanbi is about 142 km (88 mi) away, while the northernmost tip of Luzon mainland (Maira-ira Point, Pagudpud in Ilocos Norte) is about 200 km (120 mi) km away. The nearest Taiwanese territory across the Bashi Channel is the Orchid Island group, with the uninhabited Lesser Orchid island around 98 km (61 mi) away.

== Development ==
Admiralty chart of the Bashi Channel from 1925. The islands closest to Mavulis (labeled "Y'ami") are North Island (Misanga), Siayan, Mavudis, and Itbayat, all of which are part of the municipality of Itbayat of the province of Batanes, Philippines

In 2016, the Armed Forces of the Philippines Northern Luzon Command pushed for the establishment of a Marine detachment on Mavulis Island to affirm Philippines' sovereignty over the northernmost point of the archipelago. The Marine detachment was opened in 2018, with a fisherman's shelter completed in 2019 and turned over to the local municipality for maintenance and operation.

In May 2021, the Department of Defense of the Philippines announced the electrification of the island through a solar power station, with a back-up diesel generator. This was done through the help of the One Meralco Foundation. The DND also announced the commissioning of a desalination plant to provide potable water to personnel assigned to the island.

In October 2023, the Armed Forces of the Philippines inaugurated a new naval detachment as headquarters for military troops on the Island. "This island underscores the strategic importance of this detachment. It serves as our watchful sentinel in the northernmost beaches of our maritime borders, ensuring the security and sovereignty of our homeland," Fernyl G. Buca, AFP Northern Luzon Command said.

In 2024, there had been plans of upgrading several civilian ports in the Batanes Island chain, including Mavulis Island, to accommodate the unloading of more cargo from Manila and as preparation for possible contingencies that may arise should Filipino workers in Taiwan would repatriate in the event of a China-Taiwan conflict. Mavulis Island itself has been one of many frequent locations for the joint US-Philippines military training exercises called Balikatan held annually.

== Gallery ==
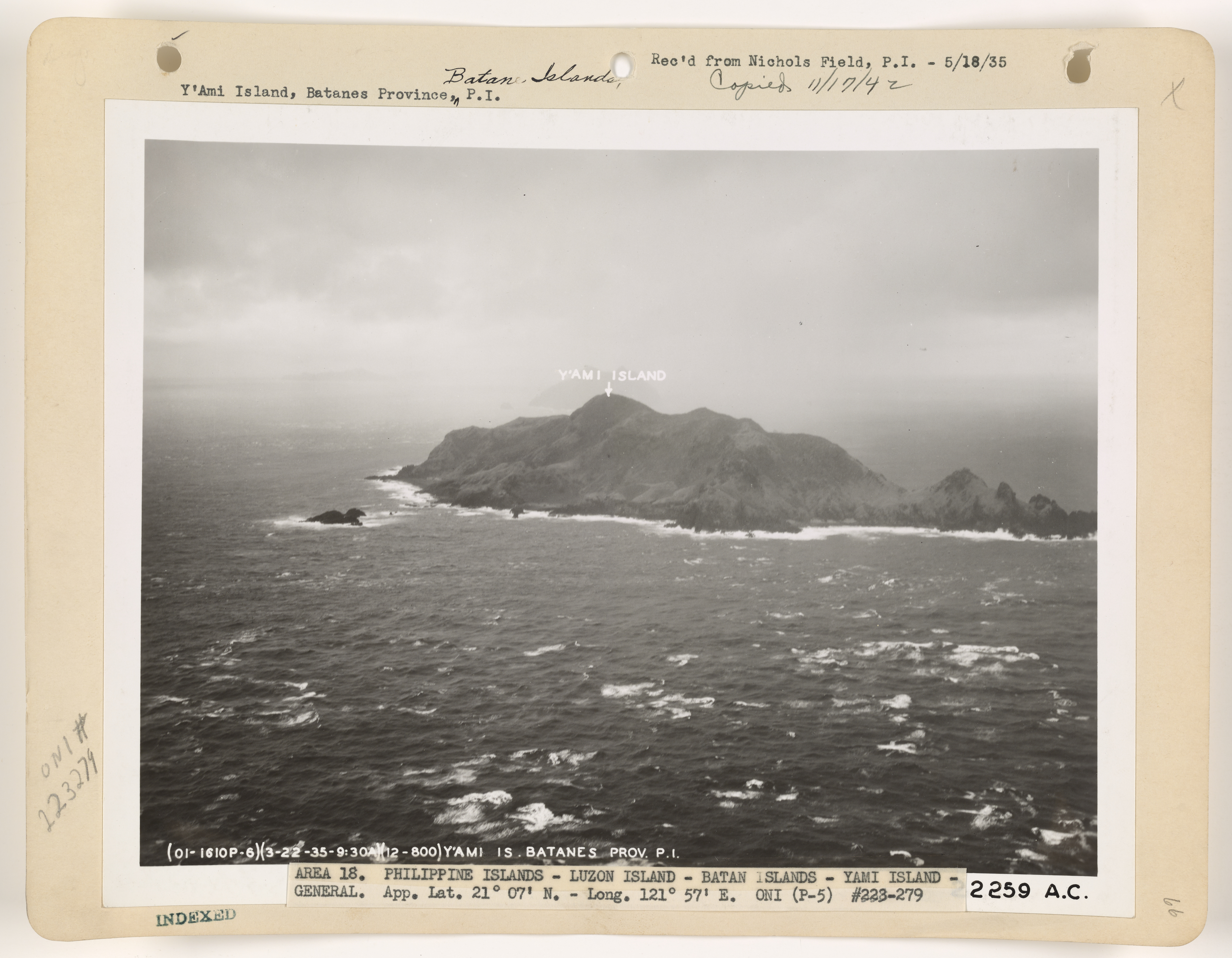
Aerial view of the island, 1935.

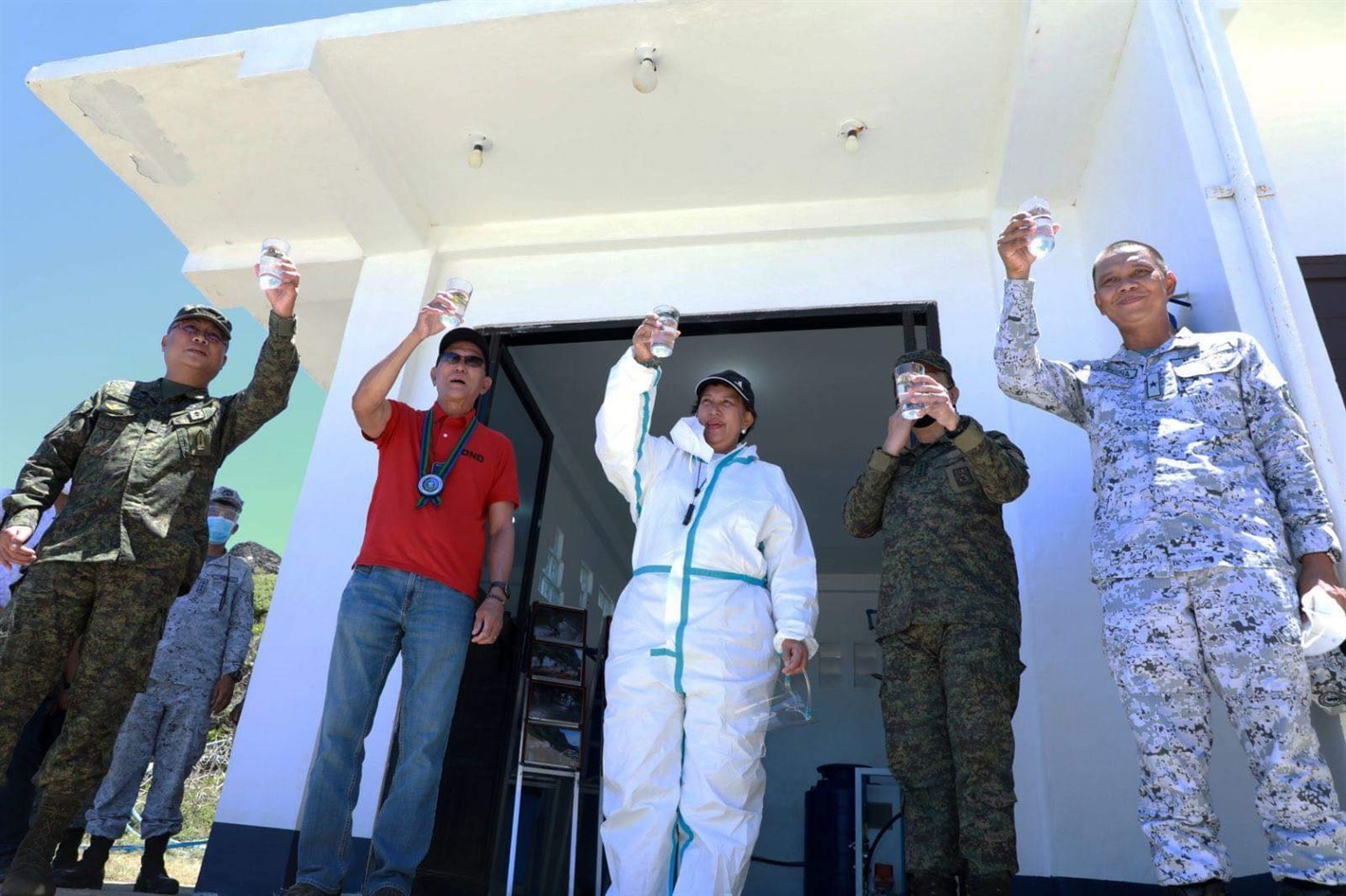
Sec. Delfin Lorenzana leads a toast of the water produced by the desalination plant at Mavulis Island.

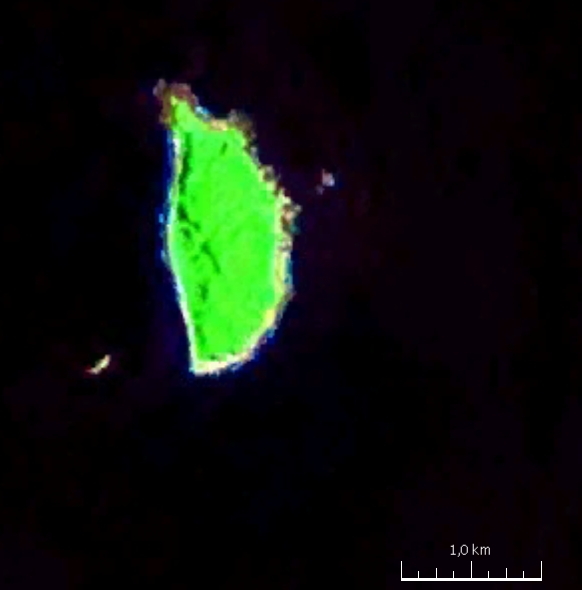
Satellite Image of Y'Ami Island.

== See also ==
- Extreme points of the Philippines
- Desert island
- List of islands
