= Caraga, Davao Oriental =

Municipality in Davao Oriental, Philippines

Caraga
- Municipality
- Municipality of Caraga
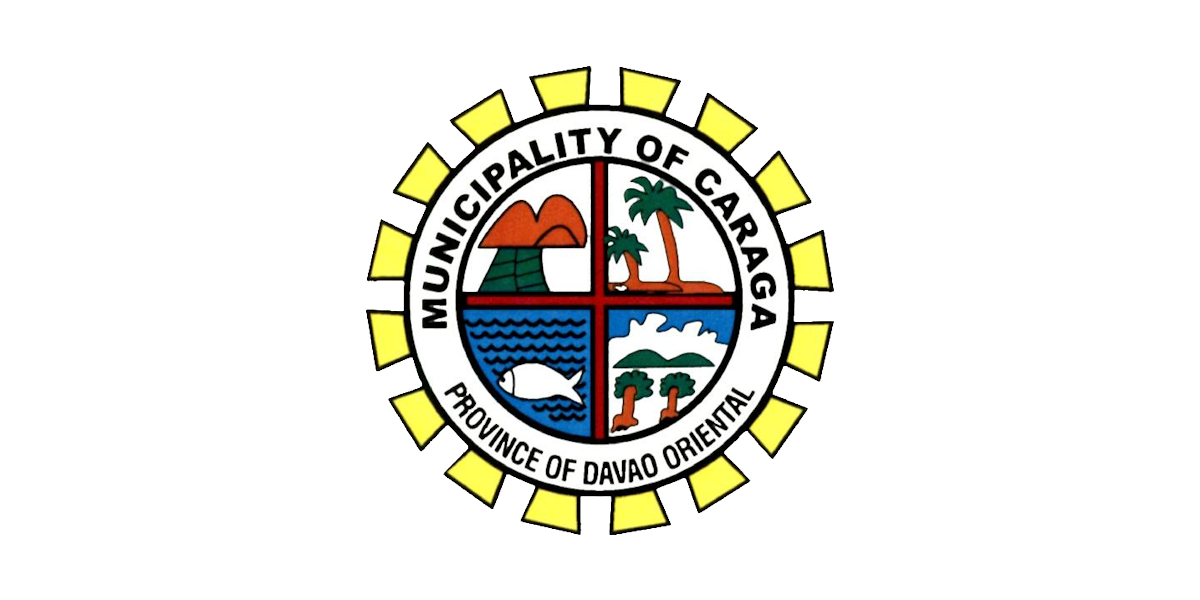
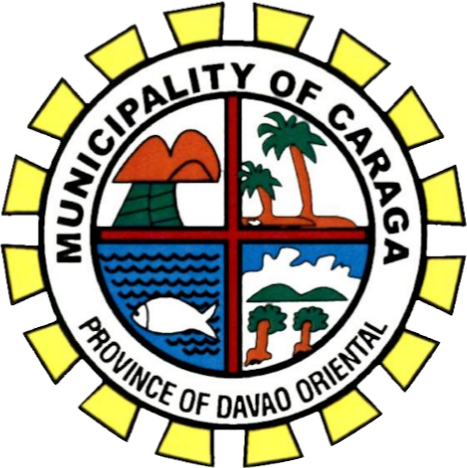
- Flag Seal
- Nicknames: Sunrise Capital of the Philippines; Easternmost Settlement of the Philippines
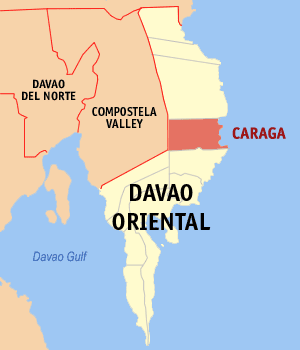
- Map of Davao Oriental with Caraga highlighted
- Interactive map of Caraga
- Location within the Philippines
- Coordinates: 7°19′42″N 126°33′57″E
- Country: Philippines
- Region: Davao Region
- Province: Davao Oriental
- District: 1st district
- Founded: October 29, 1903
- Barangays: 17 (see Barangays)

Government
  - Type: Sangguniang Bayan
  - Mayor: Ronie S. Osnan
  - Vice Mayor: Melody Anne S. Benitez
  - Representative: Corazon N. Malanyaon
  - Municipal Council: Members: Vilie Clovis M. Cayetano; Gerardo S. Duma-an Jr.; Jemaika M. Balante; Gallardo P. Hernaez; Daisy Jane B. Polancos; Franklin P. Cayetano; Eutiquio B. Pagsac Jr.; Brian P. Cruz
  - Electorate: 32,350 voters (2025)

Area
  - Total: 642.70 km^{2} (248.15 sq mi)
- Elevation: 366 m (1,201 ft)
- Highest elevation: 2,655 m (8,711 ft)
- Lowest elevation: 0 m (0 ft)

Population (2024 census)
  - Total: 39,630
  - Density: 61.66/km^{2} (159.7/sq mi)
  - Households: 9,766

Economy
  - Income class: 1st municipal income class
  - Poverty incidence: 41% (2023)
  - Revenue: ₱ 313.4 million (2024)
  - Assets: ₱ 770.7 million (2024)
  - Expenditure: ₱ 270.4 million (2024)
  - Liabilities: ₱ 156.3 million (2024)

Service provider
  - Electricity: Davao Oriental Electric Cooperative (DORECO)
- Time zone: UTC+8 (PST)
- ZIP code: 8203
- PSGC: 1102504000
- IDD : area code: +63 (0)87
- Native languages: Davawenyo; Surigaonon; Cebuano; Kalagan; Kamayo; Mandaya

Caraga, officially the Municipality of Caraga (Cebuano: Lungsod sa Caraga; Tagalog: Bayan ng Caraga), is a municipality in the province of Davao Oriental, Philippines. According to the 2024 census, it has a population of 39,630 people. It is one of the oldest settlements in the island of Mindanao.

The Pusan Point located in the town of Caraga is geographically the easternmost point of the Philippines.

== History ==
The municipality of Caraga was officially established on October 29, 1903, through Organic Act No. 21, making it one of the oldest towns in the province of Davao Oriental. As early as 1591 Caraga was already listed as a mission registered under the jurisdiction of Encomienda of Bislig.

The word "Caraga" is named after the Kalagan people (Spanish "Caragan"), a Mansakan subgroup (related to Visayans) native to the regions of Davao and parts of Caraga who speak the Kalagan languages. The name itself is from kalagan (literally "[strong] spirited") which means "fierce" or "brave"; from kalag ("spirit" or "soul") in the native animistic anito religions.

Hence, the whole Provincia de Caraga of 1622 was called "region de gente animosa", that is "region of spirited men". This being "spirited men and women" is grounded in its cultural, religious and political background. With culture, Caragans were spirited in view of their closeness to nature and attitude towards the creation. With religiosity, Caragans were spirited as to their belief in the spirits of nature (like the trees "balete tree", the rivers and mountains, sun and moon); in fact, they have "anito worship" and "ancestor worship" led by the dancing priestess (balyan) and the singing priestess (catalunan). With primitive politics, Caragans were spirited as they invited a "bagani system" of governance. A "bagani" is like a "warrior" kinglet or datu" who ruled by banditry and by occupation.

== Geography ==
The municipality is located 252 kilometres (157 mi) from Davao City, the regional center of Region XI, and 87 kilometres (54 mi) from Mati, the capital town of the province of Davao Oriental on the island of Mindanao. It lies along the eastern coast of this province, facing the Pacific Ocean. It is bounded in the north by the Municipality of Baganga in the south by the municipality of Manay, in the west by the Municipality of New Bataan, Compostela Valley Province, and on the east by the Pacific Ocean. Pusan Point of Barangay Santiago is the easternmost point of the Philippines.

Caraga coastline is irregular and the municipality is traversed by two rivers: Caraga River in the south and Manurigao River in the north.

=== Land area ===
Caraga has a total land area of 64,270 hectares (158,800 acres), representing 12.45% of the total land area of the Province of Davao Oriental, and includes 17 barangays. Barangay Pichon occupies the largest land area, with 16,300 hectares (40,000 acres), which is 25.35% of the total land area of the municipality. Barangay D.L. Balante, which is located in the southwest of Barangay Poblacion, is the smallest barangay with a land area of 975 hectares (2,410 acres) or 1.51% of the total land area of this municipality.

=== Barangays ===
Caraga is politically subdivided into 17 barangays. Each barangay consists of puroks while some have sitios.

- Alvar
- Caningag
- Don Leon Balante
- Lamiawan
- Manorigao
- Mercedes
- Palma Gil
- Pichon
- Poblacion
- San Antonio
- San Jose
- San Luis
- San Miguel
- San Pedro
- Santa Fe
- Santiago
- P.M. Sobrecarey

=== Climate ===
Caraga has a tropical rainforest climate (Af) with very heavy rainfall from December to February and moderate to heavy rainfall in the remaining months.

Climate data for Caraga
Month	Jan	Feb	Mar	Apr	May	Jun	Jul	Aug	Sep	Oct	Nov	Dec	Year
Mean daily maximum °C (°F)	30.2 (86.4)	30.3 (86.5)	31.2 (88.2)	31.9 (89.4)	31.9 (89.4)	31.4 (88.5)	31.3 (88.3)	31.5 (88.7)	31.8 (89.2)	31.9 (89.4)	31.5 (88.7)	30.7 (87.3)	31.3 (88.3)
Daily mean °C (°F)	26.0 (78.8)	26.1 (79.0)	26.6 (79.9)	27.3 (81.1)	27.5 (81.5)	27.0 (80.6)	26.8 (80.2)	27.0 (80.6)	27.1 (80.8)	27.3 (81.1)	27.0 (80.6)	26.5 (79.7)	26.9 (80.3)
Mean daily minimum °C (°F)	21.8 (71.2)	21.9 (71.4)	22.1 (71.8)	22.7 (72.9)	23.1 (73.6)	22.7 (72.9)	22.4 (72.3)	22.6 (72.7)	22.5 (72.5)	22.7 (72.9)	22.5 (72.5)	22.3 (72.1)	22.4 (72.4)
Average rainfall mm (inches)	492 (19.4)	371 (14.6)	300 (11.8)	211 (8.3)	171 (6.7)	130 (5.1)	118 (4.6)	101 (4.0)	97 (3.8)	158 (6.2)	206 (8.1)	386 (15.2)	2,741 (107.8)
Source: Climate-Data.org (modeled/calculated data, not measured locally)

== Demographics ==
Population census of Caraga
Year	Pop.	±% p.a.
1903	3,180	—
1918	6,625	+5.01%
1939	10,877	+2.39%
1948	10,838	−0.04%
1960	12,922	+1.48%
1970	16,618	+2.54%
1975	19,672	+3.44%
1980	22,831	+3.02%
1990	29,368	+2.55%
1995	31,617	+1.39%
2000	33,481	+1.24%
2007	34,278	+0.33%
2010	36,912	+2.73%
2015	40,379	+1.72%
2020	39,704	−0.35%
2024	39,630	−0.04%
Source: Philippine Statistics Authority

Based on the 2010 census, the Municipality has a total population of 36,912 people, or about 7.1% of the total population of the province.

Of the 17 barangays comprising the municipality, Pichon has the highest population of 5,188 or 14.1% of the municipality's population. Barangay Poblacion is the second population barangay at 4,710 equivalent to 12.8% of the total population and this is closely followed by Barangay Sobrecarey which has a population of 4,544 or 12.3% of the population of Caraga.

Barangay Alvar is the least populated barangay contributing only 1.7% or 627 persons to the total populations. It is followed by Barangay San Miguel, which has 833 people, and Barangay D.L. Balante which has population of 834 or 2.3% of the entire population.

=== Language ===
Household population by mother tongue (based on 1990 participation rate):

- Cebuano – 30%
- Hiligaynon - .22%
- Bagobo - .032%
- Bilaan - .35%
- Butanon - .17%
- Davaweño – 93.45%
- Mandaya – 99%
- Yakan - .14%
- Not stated - .51%

== Economy ==
Coconut products are the inhabitants' primary source of income, alongside various small-scale businesses. The municipality also has several ecotourism attractions, including Caraga Lagoon, San Luis Beach, and Pusan Point, as well as historical landmarks such as the San Salvador Church Bell (1802) and the Caraga Fortification, which features stone-built walls approximately 80 feet (24 m) high.

The municipality of Caraga has sixteen (16) wholesale trade establishments, most of which are engaged in the buying and selling of agricultural products. Four of these establishments are located in Barangay Poblacion, while the rest are distributed across other barangays. There are also twenty-three (23) retail establishments, including repair and welding shops, dormitories, lodging houses, cable television services, and telephone service providers, most of which are likewise situated in the poblacion.

The municipality's existing industries are primarily agriculture-based. At present, there are nine rice and corn mills located in Barangays San Luis, San Antonio, Poblacion, San Pedro, San Jose, and P.M. Sobrecarey. In addition, there is one furniture shop in the poblacion and a handicraft industry that produces dagmay novelties.

== Tourism ==
Scenic spots:

- Jubilee Cross, Pusan Point – a 16 feet (4.9 m) Jubilee cross made of cement and sand meant as a landmark of Millennium Sunrise event ushering the historic great Jubilee Year 2000 celebration located at Barangay Santiago, Caraga, Davao Oriental, First Light First Sight.
- Santiago Cave – a 6 square metres (65 sq ft) cave near the shoreline before reaching Pusan Point, with century-old human fossils with lengths beyond the standard measure of a native Filipino fossils.
- Old Church and Convento – a century-old building of San Salvador Parish, which served as the central mission station of the Spanish missionaries, it is made of Tisa out of the processed shells from the seashores of Caraga, the convento ground floor served as a temporary prison cell sometimes during the Spanish occupation.
- Parish Development Center – a T-shaped building within hectare land area of the San Salvador Parish of Caraga which serves as the center for seminars, retreats, and conference overlooking the Pusan Point from the Southeast Pacific Coast.
- Tourism Complex – a 3-story building meant to house the Davao Oriental Historical Museum and some historical Artifacts w / utmost significance to the Mandayan Cultural customs and traditions.
- Bango Beach Resort
- Kapuka Falls in Lamiawan
- Oguad Falls in Lamiawan
- Sungkuan Falls in P.M. Sobrecarey
- Kiti-kiti Falls in Pichon
- Bawgo Beach in Poblacion, Bawgo
- Friar's Beach (LIKSIM) Beach Resort in Poblacion
- Sunrise at Pusan Point, Barangay Santiago
- Crystal Cave in Santiago
- Philippine Eagle's Nest at Maglahus, P.M. Sobrecarey

== Transportation ==
The Davao Oriental–Surigao Coastal Highway passes through the municipality mostly along the coastal area with a total stretch of 33.462 kilometres (20.792 mi). Provincial Roads which branch out from the National Road to the barangays of P.M Sobrecarey and San Pedro amount to 32.079 kilometres (19.933 mi). The Municipal Roads which are located in the Urban center of Poblacion have a total stretch of 4.968 kilometres (3.087 mi), 1.316 kilometres (0.818 mi) of which are cemented and the remaining 3.652 kilometres (2.269 mi) are mostly all weather graveled roads.

The municipal has 14 bridges. 4 of these bridges are reinforced concrete, located along the national Road.
