= Convention Between the United States and Great Britain (1930) =

1930 agreement between the United States and United Kingdom

The Convention Between the United States and Great Britain (1930) was an agreement between the governments of the United Kingdom and the United States to definitively delimit the boundary between North Borneo (then a British protectorate) and the Philippine archipelago (then a U.S. Territory).

The convention was signed in Washington, D.C., on January 2, 1930, by U.S. Secretary of State Henry L. Stimson and British Ambassador to the United States Esme Howard. It was ratified by the U.S. in February 1930 and, after clarification by exchanges of notes between the two governments in 1930 and 1932, by the United Kingdom in November 1932. It entered into force after an exchange of ratifications on December 13, 1932.
