= Pusan Point =

Easternmost point of the Philippines

Pusan Point: Punta ng Pusan (Filipino); Punta sa Pusan (Cebuano)
- Point
- Location within Philippines Location within Mindanao
- Coordinates: 7.29333°N 126.60444°E
- Location: Barangay Santiago, Caraga, Davao Oriental
- Water bodies: (Philippines Sea) Pacific Ocean
- Elevation: 30 feet (9.1 m)

Pusan Point (Filipino: Punto ng Pusan, Cebuano: Punto sa Pusan) is the easternmost point in the Philippines, located in Barangay Santiago, Caraga, Davao Oriental. The point is located 7.29333°N 126.60444°E on a 30 feet (9.1 m) promontory facing the Pacific Ocean. It is hold significance as a navigational landmark when sailing. It became famous during Millennium celebrations in the Philippines as the first land to see the 21st century.

It is where the Pusan Point Discovery Center and Eco-Park are located, which was opened in 2016. It features two lighthouses built on the point, one of which was built in the early 1900s. It also features a Jubilee Cross, meditation kiosks, amphitheater, a swimming pool, a sundial, as well as a planetarium.

== See also ==
- Extreme points of the Philippines
- Tinaca Point - Southernmost point in the island of Mindanao
