= Diogo Island =

Island in Batanes, Philippines

Diogo
Native name: Di'nem
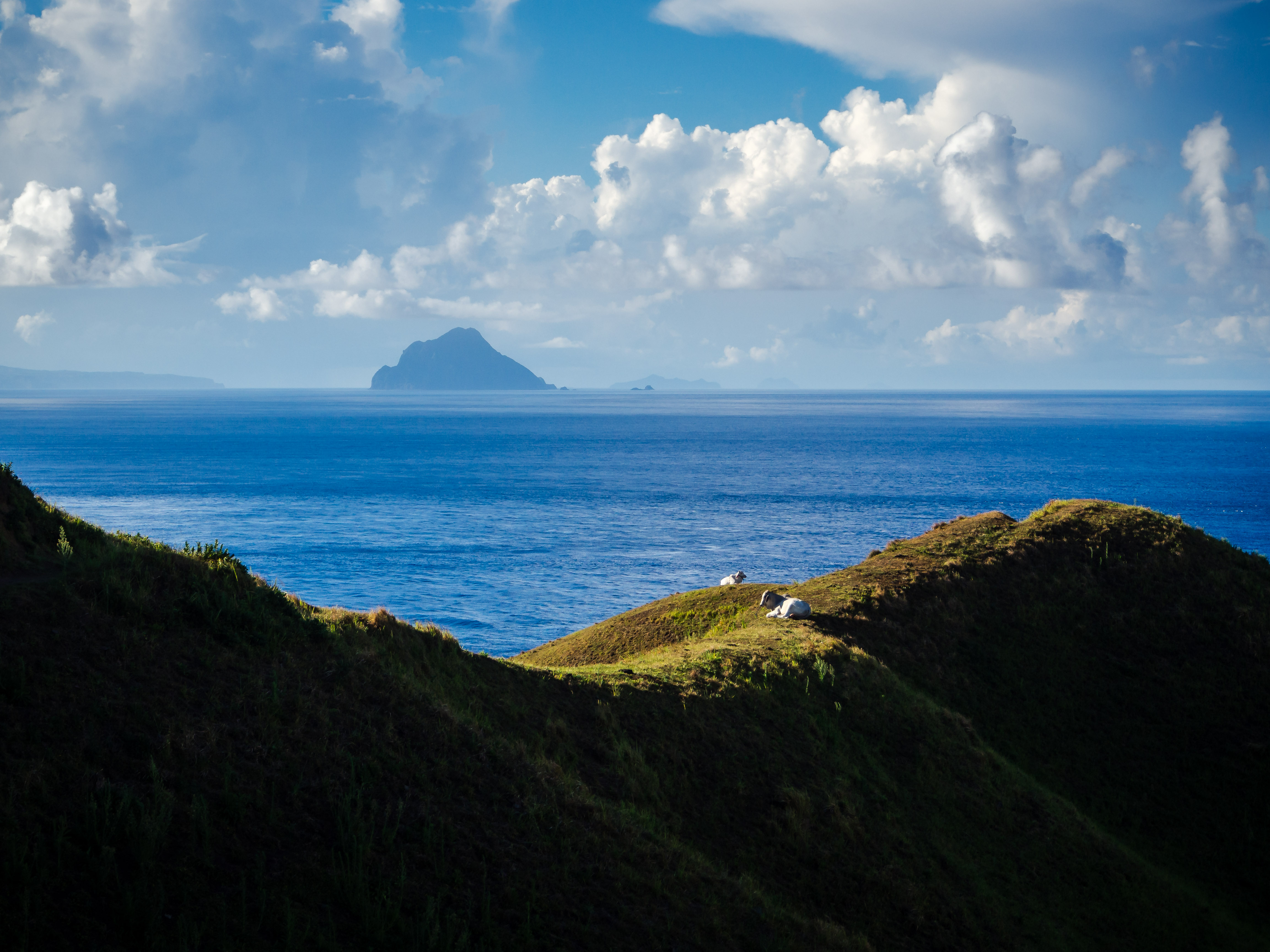
- Diogo Island (background) as seen from Batan

- Location within Batanes Location in Luzon Location in Philippines

Geography
- Location: Luzon Strait
- Coordinates: 20°42′8″N 121°55′41″E
- Archipelago: Batanes Group of Islands
- Area: 2.15 km^{2} (0.83 sq mi)
- Length: 1.2 km (0.75 mi)
- Width: 1.2 km (0.75 mi)
- Highest elevation: 547 m (1795 ft)
- Highest point: Mount Di'nem

Administration
- Philippines
- Region: Cagayan Valley
- Province: Batanes
- Municipality: Itbayat

Demographics
- Population: uninhabited

Additional information
- Official website: Batanes Province Official Website

Diogo Island known as Di'nem Island is an uninhabited volcanic island in the province of Batanes, the northernmost province in the Philippines. Also known as Di'nem Island in the native language, Diogo is a lone rock rising out of the sea, with steep cliffs on every side. Dangerous currents make landing there practically impossible. It is an extinct volcano which has suffered heavily from marine erosion.

== Geography ==
Diogo is a small, round island over 1,795 feet (547 m) high, about 3/4 mile (1.2 km) in diameter, lying 3.5 miles (5.6 km) southeastward of Itbayat Island. It is steep on the western side but has several small islets lying off its eastern side - the outermost being nearly 1/2 mile (0.80 km) distant.

== Geology ==
In 1903, Diogo Island was observed to be volcanic, discharging vapor and dark material; but another observation in 1908 indicated that the previous observations were instead small clouds that often hover around the mountain. It is listed as an inactive volcano by the Philippine Institute of Volcanology and Seismology.

== Previous names ==
In old Spanish maps, the name of the island was listed as Isla Diego or Rodonta.

== See also ==
- List of islands of the Philippines
- List of islands
- Desert island
