= Itbayat =

Municipality in Batanes, Philippines

Itbayat Pungsu nu Itbayat, Mayan
- Municipality
- Municipality of Itbayat
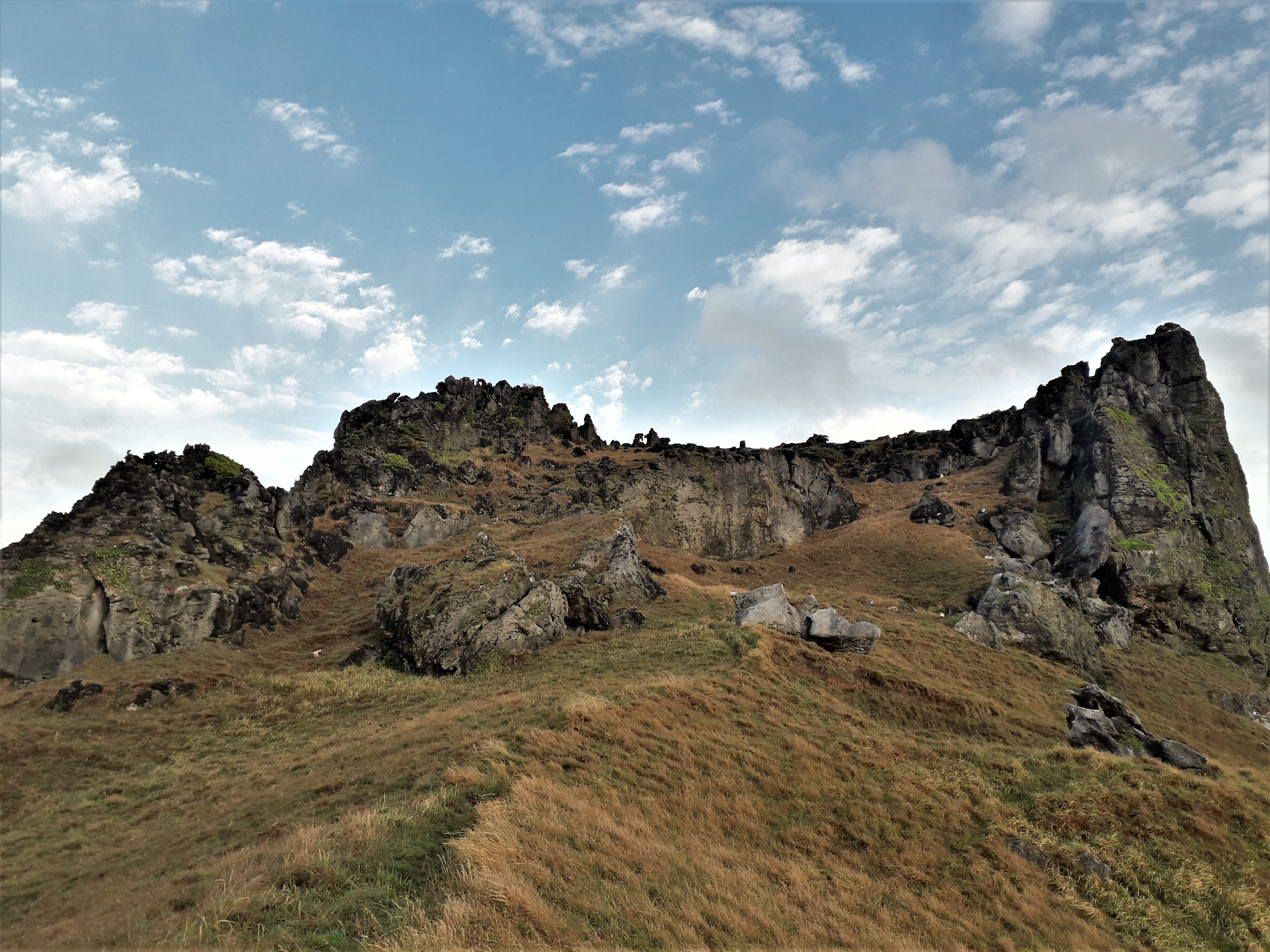
- Rapang Cliffs

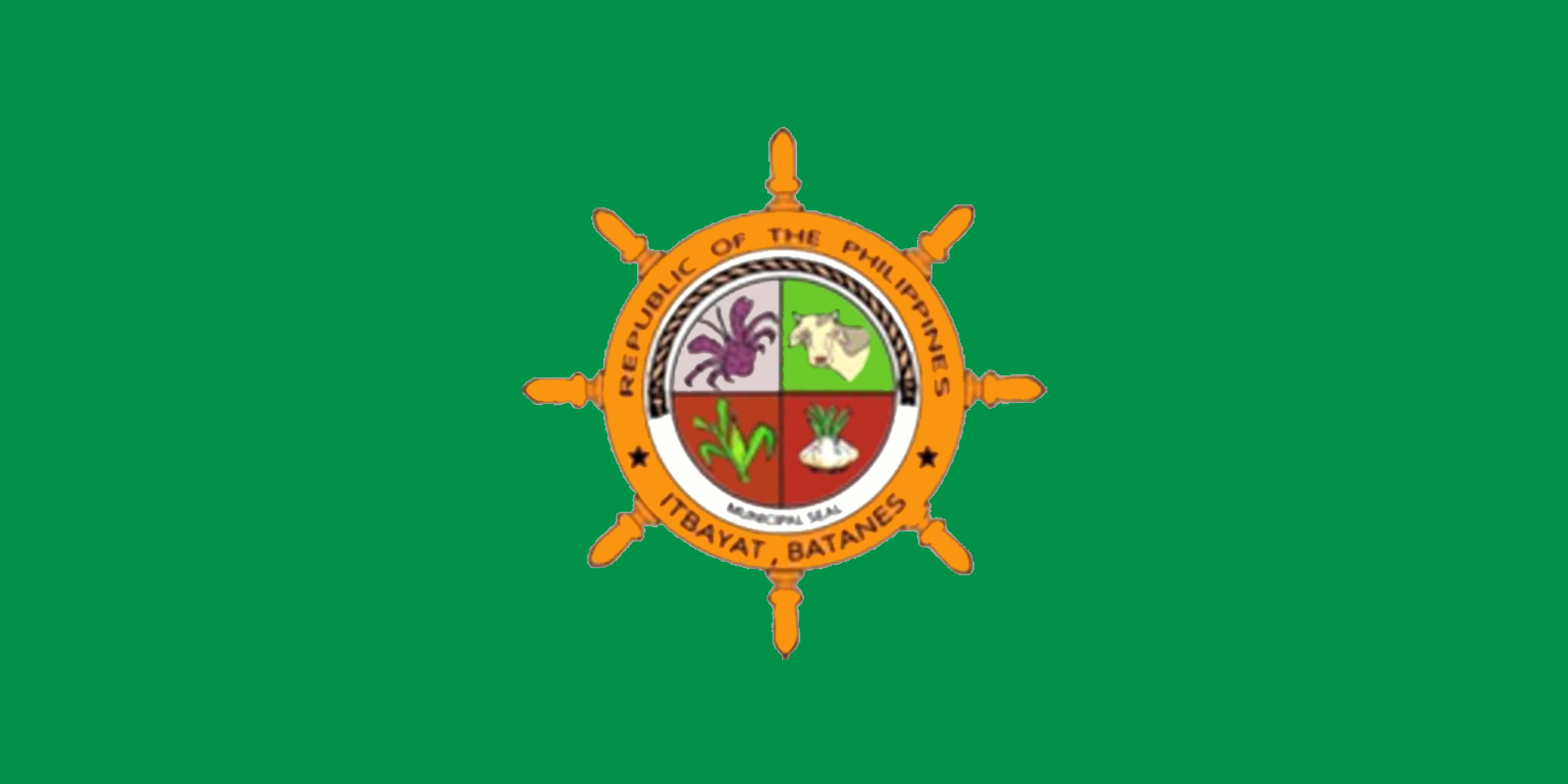
- Flag Seal
- Nickname: Northernmost Settlement of the Philippines
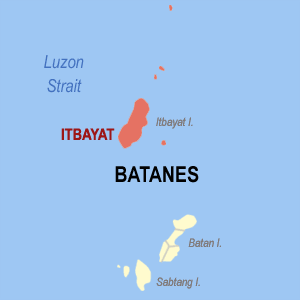
- Map of Batanes with Itbayat highlighted
- Interactive map of Itbayat
- Location within the Philippines Itbayat (Luzon) Itbayat (Batanes)
- Coordinates: 20°47′16″N 121°50′29″E
- Country: Philippines
- Region: Cagayan Valley
- Province: Batanes
- District: Lone district
- Founded: 1935
- Barangays: 5 (see Barangays)

Government
  - Type: Sangguniang Bayan
  - Mayor: Joseph Cultura
  - Vice Mayor: Jesie Estoy
  - Representative: Ciriaco B. Gato Jr.
  - Municipal Council: Members: Gershom Gato; Ernesto A. Castillo; Jonel Villa; Joel Velayo; Dyan Gutierrez; Edgar N. Garcia; Carlo Ponce; Dindin De Guzman
  - Electorate: 2,116 voters (2025)

Area
  - Total: 83.13 km^{2} (32.10 sq mi)
- Elevation: 277 m (909 ft)
- Highest elevation: 991 m (3,251 ft)
- Lowest elevation: 0 m (0 ft)

Population (2024 census)
  - Total: 2,937
  - Density: 35.33/km^{2} (91.50/sq mi)
  - Households: 923

Economy
  - Income class: 5th municipal income class
  - Poverty incidence: 8.03% (2023)
  - Revenue: ₱ 85.71 million (2024)
  - Assets: ₱ 199.4 million (2024)
  - Expenditure: ₱ 66.02 million (2024)

Service provider
  - Electricity: Batanes Electric Cooperative (BATANELCO)
- Time zone: UTC+8 (PST)
- ZIP code: 3905
- PSGC: 0200902000
- IDD : area code: +63 (0)78
- Native languages: Itbayat; Ivatan; Yami; Tagalog; Ilocano

Itbayat, officially the Municipality of Itbayat (Note: Ivatan: Kavahayan nu Itbayat; Ilocano: Ili ti Itbayat; Tagalog: Bayan ng Itbayat), is a municipality in the province of Batanes, Philippines. According to the 2024 census, it has a population of 2,937 people.

The municipality is the country's northernmost municipality, located 156 kilometers (97 mi) from the southernmost tip of Taiwan.

By land area, the main island of Itbayat is the largest in Batanes. The municipality includes the rest of the province's northern islands, all small and mostly uninhabited. These islands are, from south to north: Di'nem Island (Diogo), Siayan, A'li, Ditarem (Mavudis), Misanga (North Island), and Mavulis Island (Y'ami), the northernmost island of the Philippine archipelago.

== History ==
Between 2,000 and 4,000 years ago, a wave of animist-polytheist Austronesians arrived on Itbayat and became the ancestors of the island's people. Torongan Cliff is home to the Torongan Cave, which the island's ancestors used as their abode. The early people of the island also established the sacred Axurud, the oldest stone tomb in Batanes.

A church and civil government were established in Batan Island in 1783. In 1855, civil authority was established and the mission canonically founded in Itbayat. A settlement during the Spanish colonial period, it became a municipal district when the Americans organized the province in 1909. Finally, in 1935, it became a municipality.

On September 14, 2016, Typhoon Meranti (Ferdie) made landfall on Itbayat while at peak intensity, as a Category 5-equivalent super typhoon, with the eye passing directly over the island. During landfall, the storm's powerful winds caused extensive damage and knocked out the island's communications systems.

On July 27, 2019, a series of destructive earthquakes, the largest of them being recorded to be magnitude 6.0, caused severe damage around the town. Nine people died as a result, and sixty were injured.

In 2024, Barangay San Rafael hosted the April 14 to June 6 Balikatan exercise involving the construction of humanitarian, logistics and disaster relief warehouse at Sitio Kagonongan, a supply depot area at the San Rafael National Food Authority warehouse and an American physician’s assistant station and lodging facilities for American soldiers at Itbayat District Hospital.

In May 2024, the Philippine Coast Guard opened its first monitoring station in northern Luzon, located in Itbayat island, as part of efforts to monitor the entry of foreign vessels particularly from China.

The following month, in June 2024, the 51st Engineer Brigade' 513th Engineer Construction Battalion and United States Army, with Batanes LGU, Governor Marilou Cayco and Mayor Sabas C. De Sagon, led the dedication ceremony for a 10x8-meter concrete logistical structure, Humanitarian assistance and Disaster response relief goods warehouse, part of 'Exercise Salaknib'.

== Geography ==
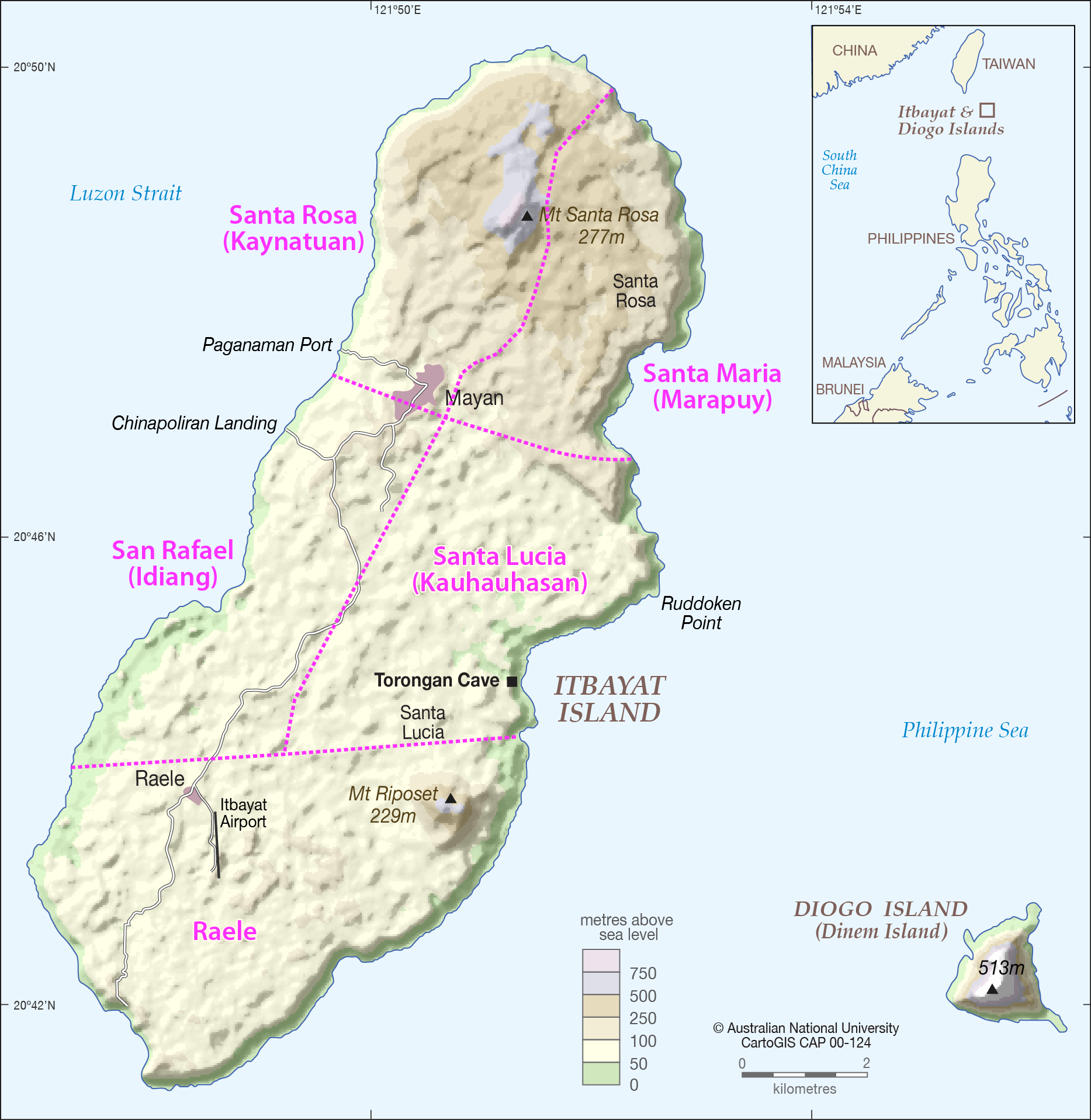
Physical map of Itbayat

Itbayat is located at 20°47′16″N 121°50′29″E.

The municipality has a land area of 83.13 square kilometres (32.10 sq mi). It constitutes 37.96% 219.01-square-kilometre- (84.56 sq mi) of the total area of Batanes.

=== Islands, islets, atolls and outcrops ===
The entire municipality of Itbayat consists of several islands, islets, atolls, and outcrops.

- Itbayat Island, the largest of the group is where the administrative center is located.
- Di'nem Island (also known as Diogo Island) is located southeast of Itbayat island. It has the largest land area out of all the uninhabited satellite islands under the jurisdiction of the municipality of Itbayat. It is an extinct volcano that peaks at 550 meters above sea level with steep terrain, a dense jungle cover, and boulder beaches.
- Siayan Island is the first uninhabited island north of Itbayat. Its name is derived from the Itbayaten word for separate, referencing its separation from the main island of Itbayat.
- A'li Islet (also spelled Ah'li) lies to the south-southwest of Ditarem island and north of Siayan island. It consists of rock formations, a shoreline, and a small hill covered with grass in the center. Often mislabeled as "Maysanga" in maps.
- Ditarem Island (also known as Mavudis or Mabudis Island, not to be confused with Mavulis) is located to the north-northeast of the A'li islet. Notably, it is the only satellite island with a documented live stream, making it a favorable grazing location for the locals of Itbayat. Its name is derived from the Itbayaten word for sharp, referencing the island's sharp and jagged borders.
- Misanga Island (also known as North Island or Maysanga Island) is the second-to-the last island north of Itbayat and located south of Mavulis. Similar to Di'nem Island, it is a protruding rock and is mostly covered by trees and some grassland. Its name is derived from the Itbayaten word for branched, referencing the island's branched peaks.
- Mavulis Island (also known as Y'ami, Dimavulis, or Mavolis), the northernmost of the Itbayat group under the jurisdiction of the municipality of Itbayat. It is the northernmost point of the Philippines and is the last territorial island bordering Taiwan.

=== Barangays ===
Itbayat is politically subdivided into five barangays. Each barangay consists of puroks and some have sitios.

| PSGC | Barangay | Population | | | ±% p.a. | |
| | | 2024 | | 2010 | | |
|---|---|---|---|---|---|---|
| 020902006 | Raele | 15.9% | 467 | 442 | ▴ | 0.38% |
| 020902007 | San Rafael (Kahijangan) | 27.0% | 793 | 789 | ▴ | 0.04% |
| 020902008 | Santa Lucia (Kawxawxasan) | 15.3% | 448 | 478 | ▾ | −0.45% |
| 020902009 | Santa Maria (Marapuy) | 16.2% | 475 | 438 | ▴ | 0.56% |
| 020902010 | Santa Rosa (Hiñatu) | 25.7% | 754 | 841 | ▾ | −0.76% |
| | Total | | 2,937 | 2,988 | ▾ | −0.12% |

=== Climate ===
Itbayat has cooler temperatures from December to February due to its northerly location and the effects of the northeast monsoon.

Climate data for Itbayat (1991–2020, extremes 1971–2023)
| Month | Jan | Feb | Mar | Apr | May | Jun | Jul | Aug | Sep | Oct | Nov | Dec | Year |
|---|---|---|---|---|---|---|---|---|---|---|---|---|---|
| Record high °C (°F) | 30.6 (87.1) | 31.8 (89.2) | 32.5 (90.5) | 34.8 (94.6) | 36.5 (97.7) | 35.6 (96.1) | 37.0 (98.6) | 34.6 (94.3) | 34.5 (94.1) | 32.9 (91.2) | 31.8 (89.2) | 30.2 (86.4) | 37.0 (98.6) |
| Mean daily maximum °C (°F) | 24.6 (76.3) | 25.0 (77.0) | 26.7 (80.1) | 28.5 (83.3) | 30.2 (86.4) | 31.5 (88.7) | 31.3 (88.3) | 30.8 (87.4) | 30.3 (86.5) | 28.9 (84.0) | 27.5 (81.5) | 25.4 (77.7) | 28.4 (83.1) |
| Daily mean °C (°F) | 21.5 (70.7) | 21.8 (71.2) | 23.3 (73.9) | 25.1 (77.2) | 27.0 (80.6) | 28.2 (82.8) | 28.1 (82.6) | 27.8 (82.0) | 27.3 (81.1) | 25.8 (78.4) | 24.4 (75.9) | 22.3 (72.1) | 25.2 (77.4) |
| Mean daily minimum °C (°F) | 18.3 (64.9) | 18.6 (65.5) | 19.9 (67.8) | 21.8 (71.2) | 23.8 (74.8) | 25.0 (77.0) | 24.9 (76.8) | 24.7 (76.5) | 24.3 (75.7) | 22.7 (72.9) | 21.3 (70.3) | 19.2 (66.6) | 22.0 (71.6) |
| Record low °C (°F) | 12.2 (54.0) | 10.7 (51.3) | 12.7 (54.9) | 14.0 (57.2) | 18.8 (65.8) | 20.0 (68.0) | 18.7 (65.7) | 20.0 (68.0) | 19.8 (67.6) | 15.0 (59.0) | 14.8 (58.6) | 12.5 (54.5) | 10.7 (51.3) |
| Average rainfall mm (inches) | 149.1 (5.87) | 70.0 (2.76) | 49.8 (1.96) | 61.5 (2.42) | 187.8 (7.39) | 191.9 (7.56) | 254.0 (10.00) | 365.8 (14.40) | 292.6 (11.52) | 272.8 (10.74) | 224.5 (8.84) | 158.2 (6.23) | 2,278 (89.69) |
| Average rainy days (≥ 1 mm) | 15 | 9 | 6 | 5 | 11 | 10 | 13 | 16 | 14 | 13 | 14 | 16 | 142 |
| Average relative humidity (%) | 84 | 85 | 85 | 86 | 87 | 87 | 88 | 89 | 88 | 87 | 86 | 85 | 86 |
Source: PAGASA

== Demographics ==
Population census of Itbayat
| Year | Pop. | ±% p.a. |
|---|---|---|
| 1903 | 1,198 | — |
| 1918 | 1,363 | +0.86% |
| 1939 | 1,625 | +0.84% |
| 1948 | 1,954 | +2.07% |
| 1960 | 2,365 | +1.60% |
| 1970 | 2,760 | +1.55% |
| 1975 | 2,978 | +1.54% |
| 1980 | 2,859 | −0.81% |
| 1990 | 3,448 | +1.89% |
| 1995 | 3,129 | −1.80% |
| 2000 | 3,616 | +3.15% |
| 2007 | 3,069 | −2.24% |
| 2010 | 2,988 | −0.97% |
| 2015 | 2,867 | −0.78% |
| 2020 | 3,128 | +1.85% |
| 2024 | 2,937 | −1.50% |
Source: Philippine Statistics Authority

In the 2024 census, Itbayat had a population of 2,937 people. The population density was 35 inhabitants per square kilometre (91/sq mi).

== Economy ==
Poverty incidence of Itbayat (%)

Source: Philippine Statistics Authority

=== Fishing ===
In 2024, Batanes's first municipal tilapia hatchery was inaugurated in Barangay Raele.

== Government ==
=== Local government ===
Itbayat belongs to the lone congressional district of the province of Batanes. It is governed by a mayor designated as its local chief executive, and by a municipal council as its legislative body in accordance with the Local Government Code. The mayor, vice mayor, and the councilors are elected directly by the people through an election held every three years.

=== Elected officials ===
Members of the Municipal Council (2025–2028)
| Position | Name |
|---|---|
| Congressman | Ciriaco Gato Jr. |
| Mayor | Joseph Cultura |
| Vice-Mayor | Jesie Estoy |
| Councilors | Gershom Gato |
| Councilors | Ernesto A. Castillo |
| Councilors | Jonel Villa |
| Councilors | Joel Velayo |
| Councilors | Dyan Gutierrez |
| Councilors | Edgar Garcia |
| Councilors | Carlo Ponce |
| Councilors | Dindin De Guzman |

== Education ==
The Schools Division of Batanes governs the town's public education system. The division office is a field office of the DepEd in Cagayan Valley region. The Itbayat Schools District Office governs the public and private elementary and high schools throughout the municipality.

=== Primary and elementary schools ===
- Itbayat Central School
- Mayan Elementary School
- Yawran Barrio School

=== Secondary schools ===
- Itbayat National Agricultural High School
- Raele Integrated School

== Tourism ==
- Siayan Island: the nearest island to the north of Itbayat. It has beaches accessible by a one-hour ride by motorboat from Itbayat (depending on sea condition).
- Di'nem Island: this volcanic island is located east of Itbayat. It features boulder beaches with towering cliffs used for mountain climbing.
- Rapang Cliff: A natural park with a ringing mushroom-like rock. It is believed to have been used by the ancient settlers to call a meeting.
- Mount Riposed: One of the two major elevations (aside from Karaboboan) that have been the foundation of Itbayat Island. Situated in the south-eastern part of Itbayat has an elevation of 900 feet (270 m) that offers views of the island.
- Mount Karoboboan (Mount Santa Rosa): The other extinct volcano of Itbayat Island is in the island's northern half. Near the 800-foot (240 m) mountain is a settlement of the early settlers of Itbayat near Barangay Santa Rosa.
- Torongan Cave: The most ancient dwelling place has a burial ground on top. It is believed to be the first landing place of the Austronesians from Taiwan around 2000 BC.
- Nahili du Votox: With its own Ijang and boat-shaped burial grounds, it is also an ancient settlement where many broken clay pots have been found. Its Ijang has views of Dinem and Itbayat Island's eastern coast.
- Underground Stream in Kumayasakas: The stream flows down the sea, north-west of Itbayat.
- Itbayat Caves: These caves feature stalagmites and stalactites, and have been given the names Northern Sarokan, Eastern Sarokan, Do'tboran Cave, and Pivangan Cave.
- Agosan Rock: rock formation north of Itbayat which is a breeding site for endangered birds.
- Vernacular houses: A typical vernacular house is composed of three structures:
  - (the kitchen where they use kugon to cook
  - the actual house where people stay
  - the bathroom).
- Port Mauyen: An alternative port south of Itbayat with a 14-turn zigzag road. It is 14 kilometres (8.7 mi) south of the town.
- Groto: 155 steps up

== Infrastructure ==
Transportation to the island town is by boat or by plane direct from the provincial capital of Basco.

Jorge Abad Airport serves as the gateway to the island for STOL planes through Basco airport or other airports from mainland Luzon. There are small carriers that provide commercial scheduled and non-scheduled flights to Itbayat from Basco Airport. Jorge Abad Airport is served by the following small airline companies:

- Aerospeed Air
- Fliteline
- Sky Pasada

The town can be reached by sea going vessels that provide transportation for locals and tourists between Itbayat and Basco. The following companies provide daily scheduled voyage between Basco and Itbayat:

- M/B Ocean Spirit
- M/B Itranza
- M/B Veronica

There are no private charter boats or larger vessels in the island. Charter flights, however, can be scheduled to and from the town.
