= Tinaca Point =

Coordinates: 5°33′22″N 125°19′41″E

Tinaca Point is a headland in the southern part of Davao Occidental, in the Philippines. It is the southernmost point of Mindanao Island, and according to the International Hydrographic Organization, marks the division point between the Celebes Sea to the west and Philippine Sea to the east.

Tinaca Point has an 11 metres (36 ft) high lighthouse with a focal plane of 43 metres (141 ft) and white flash every 5 seconds.
