= Siayan Island =

Island in Batanes, Philippines

Siayan
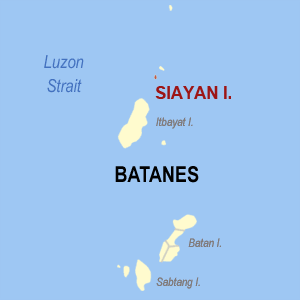

- Location in Batanes Location in Luzon Location in Philippines

Geography
- Location: Luzon Strait
- Coordinates: 20°54′12″N 121°54′10″E
- Archipelago: Batanes Group of Islands

Administration
- Philippines
- Region: Cagayan Valley
- Province: Batanes
- Municipality: Itbayat

Siayan is an uninhabited island of Batanes, the northernmost archipelagic province of the Philippines. The island is about 1/2 mile to 3/4 miles in diameter and lies about 5 miles (8.0 km) north-northeastward of Itbayat Island. Its name is derived from the Itbayaten word for "separate", referencing its separation from the main island of Itbayat.

The closest island to Siayan is the A'li Islet to the north; followed by Mavudis Island (Ditarem), which is about 2.4 kilometres (1.5 mi) north-northeast of Siayan. There are several detached rocks off Siayan's northeastern side, rendering the channel between it and Mavudis unsafe for larger vessels.

Siayan has an elevation of 538 ft (164 m) and is listed as an inactive volcano, by the Philippine Institute of Volcanology and Seismology. The highest peak in the island is a volcanic pinnacle known as Domnayjang.

== See also ==
- List of islands of the Philippines
