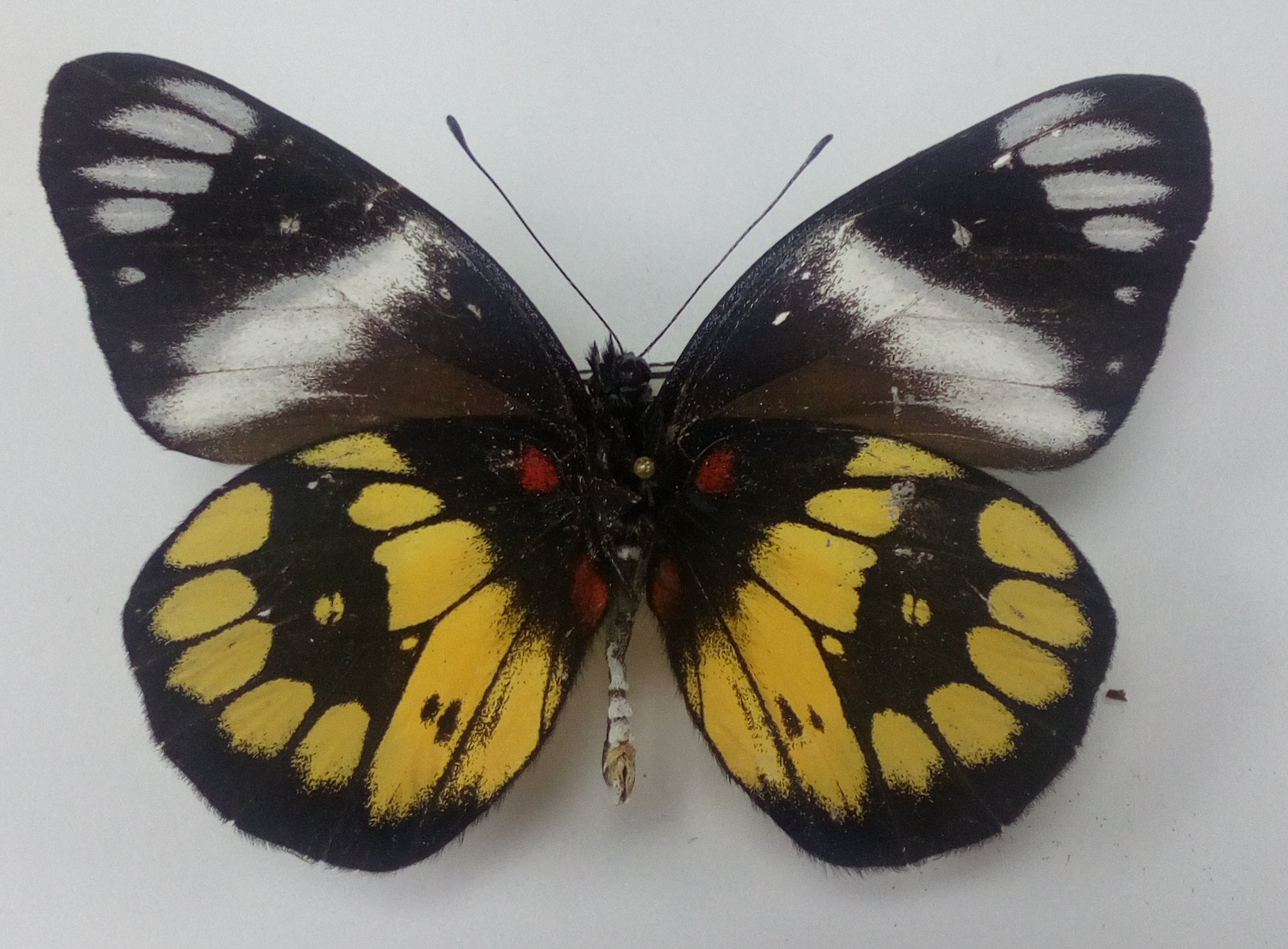

Scientific classification
- Kingdom: Animalia
- Phylum: Arthropoda
- Class: Insecta
- Order: Lepidoptera
- Family: Pieridae
- Genus: Delias
- Species: D. woodi

Binomial name
- Delias woodi Talbot, 1928

= Delias woodi =

Species of butterfly

Delias woodi is a species of pierine butterfly endemic to Mindanao in the Philippines.

The wingspan is 60–65 mm.

== Subspecies ==
- Delias woodi woodi (Mt. Apo, Mindanao)
- Delias woodi colini Schroder, 1977 (Mt. Kitanlad, Mindanao)
- Delias woodi tboli Schroder & Treadaway, 1984 (Mt. Parket, Mindanao)

== Taxonomy ==
It may be a form of Delias ottonia.
