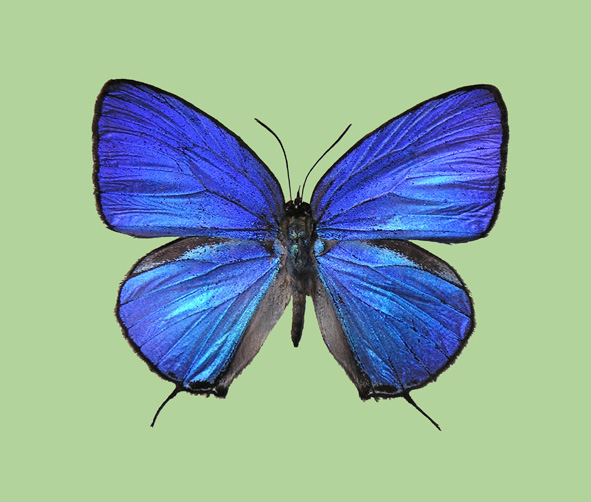
- A. a. natsumiae, male upperside, Negros island, Philippines
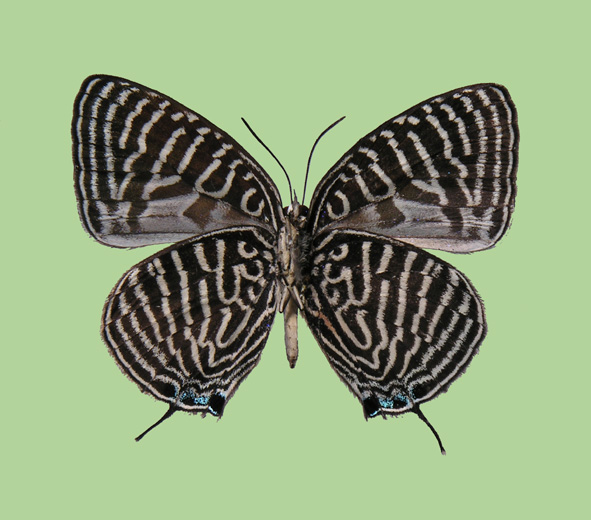
- A. a. natsumiae, male underside, Negros

Scientific classification
- Kingdom: Animalia
- Phylum: Arthropoda
- Clade: Pancrustacea
- Class: Insecta
- Order: Lepidoptera
- Family: Lycaenidae
- Genus: Arhopala
- Species: A. aronya

Binomial name
- Arhopala aronya Hewitson, 1869

= Arhopala aronya =

Species of butterfly

Arhopala aronya is a species of butterfly in the family Lycaenidae first described by William Chapman Hewitson in 1869. Its forewing length is 17–18 mm. It is endemic to the Philippines. It is uncommon or local.

== Description ==
aronya is above darker blue, the male may even be lustrous purple or lilac. Beneath the markings are of a pure white. It represents the preceding species [ Arhopala sangira in the Philippines.Male and female are beneath alike.

== Subspecies ==
- A. a. aronya Hewitson, [1869]
- A. a. natsumiae H. Hayashi, [1981]
- A. a. mangyan Schroeder & Treadaway, [2000]
- A. a. kalinga Schroeder & Treadaway, [2000]

== Range ==
The nominotypical subspecies is distributed on Dinagat, Leyte and Mindanao islands. The subspecies A. a. mangyan is on Mindoro Island and A. a. kalinga is on Luzon and Marinduque islands. The subspecies A. a. natsumiae is found on Negros Island.

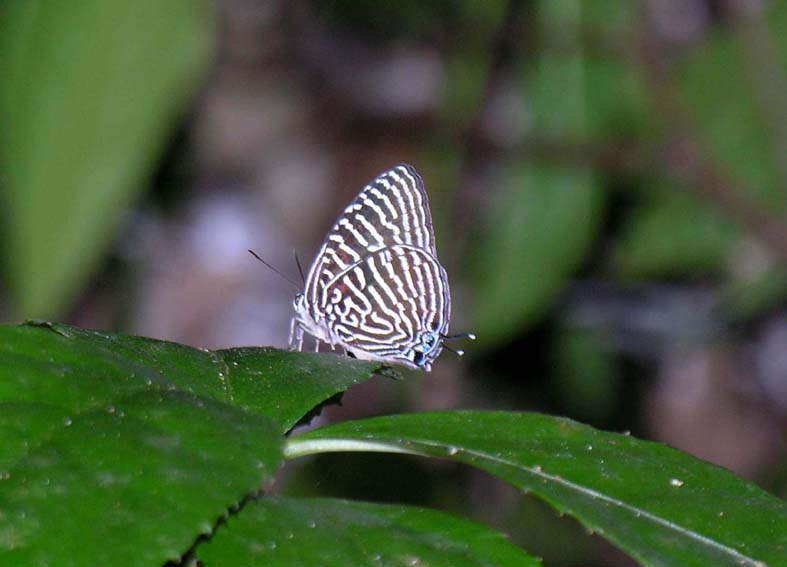
Arhopala aronya natsumiae, Kanlaon mountain, Negros Island

== Synonyms ==
- Amblypodia aronya Hewitson, [1869]: 14e, pl. 3b, figs 45, 46.
- Arhopala aronya (Hewitson); Bethune-Baker, 1903: 57; D'Abrera, 1986: 566; Treadaway, 1995: 75; Takanami & Seki, Pl. C, consulted, 14.xi.2011.
- Narathura aronya (Hewitson); Evans, 1957: 99.
