= List of bays of the Philippines =

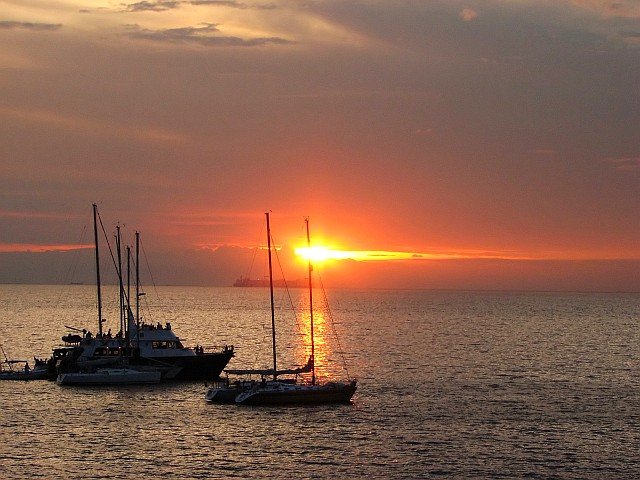
Manila Bay in Luzon

Owing to its numerous islands, the Philippines has an irregular coastline stretching 334,539 kilometers (207,873 miles). The islands' rugged coastlines provide several bays and inlets listed below. FYI, Laguna de Bay is not a bay, but a lake.

== List ==
- Note: Coordinates are sortable by latitude.

Name	Province	Nearest town	Coordinates
Abag Bay	Davao Oriental	Governor Generoso	6°25′19″N 126°07′34″E
Agno Bay	Pangasinan	Agno	16°07′29″N 119°46′18″E
Ajuy Bay	Iloilo	Ajuy	11°07′16″N 123°02′45″E
Alayao Bay	Camarines Norte	Capalonga	14°19′47″N 122°30′38″E
Alligator Bay	Palawan	El Nido	10°51′31″N 119°18′35″E
Alubijid Bay	Misamis Oriental	Alubijid	8°35′39″N 124°28′32″E
Araceli Bay	Palawan	Araceli	10°32′45″N 119°58′47″E
Arevalo Bay	Leyte	San Isidro	11°22′01″N 124°21′09″E
Awasan Bay	Dinagat Islands	Dinagat	9°55′56″N 125°34′49″E
Bacao Bay	Palawan	Araceli	10°38′37″N 120°15′06″E
Bacaran Bay	Palawan	Dumaran	10°31′25″N 119°56′25″E
Bacoor Bay	Cavite	Bacoor	14°27′31″N 120°54′02″E
Bacuit Bay	Palawan	El Nido	11°04′44″N 119°23′17″E
Baculin Bay	Davao Oriental	Caraga	7°25′27″N 126°34′07″E
Badian Bay	Cebu	Badian	9°54′11″N 123°22′52″E
Bagac Bay	Bataan	Bagac	14°36′04″N 120°22′00″E
Bagacay Bay	Iloilo	San Dionisio	11°19′45″N 123°06′38″E
Baganga Bay	Davao Oriental	Baganga	7°35′42″N 126°35′11″E
Balagin Bay	Mindoro Occidental	Lubang	13°49′40″N 120°10′22″E
Balamban Bay	Cebu	Balamban	10°30′04″N 123°42′38″E
Balayan Bay	Batangas	Balayan	13°51′15″N 120°48′02″E
Baler Bay	Aurora	Baler	15°51′17″N 121°35′52″E
Balete Bay	Davao Oriental	Mati	6°52′26″N 126°10′42″E
Balusingan Bay	Sorsogon	Santa Magdalena	12°37′46″N 124°06′24″E
Bancal Bay	Palawan	Bataraza	8°21′59″N 117°13′25″E
Banga Bay	Aklan	New Washington	11°34′04″N 122°27′32″E
Bangui Bay	Ilocos Norte	Bangui	18°33′57″N 120°43′39″E
Barbacan Bay	Palawan	Roxas	10°20′23″N 119°22′34″E
Base Bay	Palawan	El Nido	11°22′17″N 119°27′58″E
Basiad Bay	Camarines Norte	Santa Elena	14°11′34″N 122°18′06″E
Basiauan Bay	Davao del Sur	Santa Maria	6°31′30″N 125°31′26″E
Basiauang Bay	Sultan Kudarat	Kalamansig	6°28′06″N 124°01′42″E
Batangas Bay	Batangas	Batangas City	13°42′58″N 121°00′02″E
Bentowan Bay	Palawan	Dumaran	10°37′04″N 119°43′57″E
Biga Biga Bay	Palawan	Balabac	7°58′00″N 117°05′00″E
Binaluan Bay	Palawan	El Nido	10°55′29″N 119°19′42″E
Binga Bay	Palawan	Taytay	10°45′53″N 119°18′43″E
Binunsalian Bay	Palawan	Puerto Princesa	9°39′05″N 118°43′39″E
Bislig Bay	Surigao del Sur	Bislig	8°12′55″N 126°22′13″E
Bodaran Bay	Palawan	Cuyo	10°50′02″N 121°03′55″E
Bogo Bay	Cebu	Bogo	11°04′43″N 124°01′03″E
Bolalo Bay	Palawan	El Nido	10°56′05″N 119°14′48″E
Bulalacao Bay	Mindoro Oriental	Bulalacao	12°18′55″N 121°21′04″E
Buloc Bay	Mindoro Oriental	Naujan	13°14′44″N 121°23′01″E
Buras Bay	Palawan	Araceli	10°41′38″N 120°15′44″E
Burdeos Bay	Quezon	Burdeos	14°45′59″N 122°05′43″E
Busan Bay	Zamboanga Sibugay	Roseller Lim	7°35′35″N 122°27′36″E
Butauanan Bay	Camarines Sur	Siruma	14°06′03″N 123°16′22″E
Butuan Bay	Agusan del Norte	Magallanes	9°04′01″N 125°21′38″E
Cabalian Bay	Southern Leyte	San Juan	10°12′30″N 125°11′08″E
Cabay Bay	Eastern Samar	Balangkayan	11°27′35″N 125°30′43″E
Caboang Bay	Palawan	Balabac	8°00′56″N 117°04′20″E
Cabugao Bay	Catanduanes	Virac	13°33′51″N 124°15′33″E
Cabugao Bay	Ilocos Sur	Cabugao	17°50′00″N 120°26′00″E
Cabulao Bay	Bohol	Mabini	9°56′43″N 124°33′38″E
Calagcalag Bay	Negros Oriental	Ayungon	9°49′54″N 123°08′19″E
Calancan Bay	Marinduque	Santa Cruz	13°32′20″N 121°58′46″E
Calape Bay	Bohol	Calape	9°53′38″N 123°51′09″E
Calasag Bay	Palawan	Dumaran	10°28′43″N 119°52′17″E
Calauag Bay	Quezon	Calauag	14°02′00″N 122°13′00″E
Camarisan Bay	Palawan	Balabac	7°56′20″N 117°04′56″E
Campodoc Bay	Leyte	Tabango	11°17′02″N 124°22′31″E
Campomanes Bay	Negros Occidental	Sipalay	9°41′24″N 122°24′21″E
Canal Bay	Surigao del Norte	Placer	9°39′41″N 125°37′16″E
Canipan Bay	Palawan	Rizal	8°35′18″N 117°15′08″E
Cansaga Bay	Cebu	Consolacion	10°20′30″N 123°58′45″E
Cañacao Bay	Cavite	Cavite City	14°29′11″N 120°57′28″E
Capangdanan Bay	Palawan	Araceli	10°42′03″N 120°15′18″E
Capiz Bay	Capiz	Roxas	11°34′59″N 122°42′17″E
Caraga Bay	Davao Oriental	Caraga	7°17′58″N 126°35′01″E
Caramay Bay	Palawan	Roxas	10°09′46″N 119°14′44″E
Carcar Bay	Cebu	Carcar	10°04′54″N 123°38′54″E
Carigara Bay	Leyte	Carigara	11°22′35″N 124°37′39″E
Carmen Bay	Romblon	Calatrava	12°36′55″N 122°08′47″E
Carrascal Bay	Surigao del Sur	Carrascal	9°25′31″N 125°57′57″E
Cartagena Bay	Negros Occidental	Sipalay	9°48′19″N 122°23′22″E
Casapsapan Bay	Aurora	Casiguran	16°19′01″N 122°12′38″E
Casiguran Bay	Aurora	Casiguran	16°13′30″N 122°06′11″E
Casogoran Bay	Eastern Samar	Guiuan	10°45′43″N 125°43′42″E
Casul Bay	Misamis Occidental	Sapang Dalaga	8°35′22″N 123°34′06″E
Catabangan Bay	Camarines Sur	Del Gallego	13°52′18″N 122°37′30″E
Catagupan Bay	Palawan	Balabac	7°57′43″N 116°56′00″E
Catanauan Bay	Quezon	Catanauan	13°34′55″N 122°18′36″E
Cateel Bay	Davao Oriental	Boston	7°54′04″N 126°24′09″E
Catmon Bay	Negros Occidental	Hinoba-an	9°36′53″N 122°27′17″E
Caunayan Bay	Ilocos Norte	Pagudpud	18°38′29″N 120°49′15″E
Clarendon Bay	Palawan	Balabac	7°48′52″N 117°01′20″E
Cobo Bay	Catanduanes	Pandan	14°01′10″N 124°06′59″E
Cogolong Bay	Mindoro Oriental	Mansalay	12°29′16″N 121°26′33″E
Cogton Bay	Bohol	Candijay	9°51′04″N 124°32′32″E
Colasi Bay	Mindoro Oriental	Mansalay	12°26′28″N 121°25′00″E
Coloconto Bay	Batangas	San Juan	13°41′48″N 121°26′34″E
Concepcion Bay	Iloilo	San Dionisio	11°19′32″N 123°08′39″E
Condulingan Bay	Zamboanga del Norte	Baliguian	7°48′34″N 122°08′21″E
Coral Bay	Palawan	Bataraza	8°26′58″N 117°20′54″E
Coron Bay	Palawan	Coron	11°54′00″N 120°08′00″E
Coronado Bay	Zamboanga del Norte	Baliguian	7°54′43″N 122°13′12″E
Cuabo Bay	Davao Oriental	San Isidro	6°51′35″N 126°01′19″E
Culasian Bay	Palawan	Rizal	8°52′11″N 117°28′58″E
Dahican Bay	Camarines Norte	Jose Panganiban	14°19′35″N 122°36′39″E
Dahican Bay	Surigao del Sur	Carrascal	9°28′32″N 125°55′53″E
Dalawan Bay	Palawan	Balabac	7°53′39″N 117°04′30″E
Dapitan Bay	Zamboanga del Norte	Dapitan	8°38′58″N 123°23′12″E
Darocotan Bay	Palawan	El Nido	11°20′41″N 119°31′37″E
Dasol Bay	Pangasinan	Dasol	15°50′21″N 119°51′01″E
Dayhangan Bay	Dinagat Islands	Libjo	10°11′00″N 125°31′00″E
Diapitan Bay	Aurora	Dilasag	16°25′09″N 122°13′04″E
Dibayabay Bay	Aurora	San Luis	15°38′11″N 121°36′03″E
Dibut Bay	Aurora	San Luis	15°40′40″N 121°36′45″E
Dingalan Bay	Aurora	Dingalan	15°20′39″N 121°25′06″E
Domiri Bay	Samar	Daram	11°36′56″N 124°46′00″E
Dumanquilas Bay	Zamboanga del Sur	Kumalarang	7°40′22″N 123°05′47″E
Dumaran Bay	Palawan	Dumaran	10°31′29″N 119°45′30″E
Dungun Bay	Tawi-Tawi	Panglima Sugala	5°09′29″N 120°07′33″E
Dupon Bay	Leyte	Isabel	10°55′07″N 124°25′34″E
Dupulisan Bay	Zamboanga del Sur	Dumalinao	7°46′26″N 123°26′16″E
Emilia Bay	Palawan	Linapacan	11°25′17″N 119°39′08″E
Eran Bay	Palawan	Rizal	9°04′09″N 117°42′41″E
Gan Bay	Ilocos Norte	Currimao	18°00′00″N 120°29′00″E
Gingoog Bay	Misamis Oriental	Gingoog	8°54′53″N 125°07′20″E
Green Island Bay	Palawan	Roxas	10°14′47″N 119°25′00″E
Guimbirayan Bay	Romblon	Santa Fe	12°10′16″N 122°02′46″E
Guindulman Bay	Bohol	Guindulman	9°41′30″N 124°27′49″E
Gumaus Bay	Camarines Norte	Paracale	14°19′48″N 122°43′41″E
Hinatuan Bay	Surigao del Sur	Hinatuan	8°20′57″N 126°21′40″E
Hinunangan Bay	Southern Leyte	Hinunangan	10°24′28″N 125°12′59″E
Honda Bay	Palawan	Puerto Princesa	9°54′02″N 118°46′58″E
Igang Bay	Guimaras	Nueva Valencia	10°31′03″N 122°30′57″E
Igat Bay	Zamboanga del Sur	Margosatubig	7°36′21″N 123°09′03″E
Igsoso Bay	Mindoro Occidental	Paluan	13°15′40″N 120°31′00″E
Ilian Bay	Palawan	Dumaran	10°24′32″N 119°35′21″E
Iligan Bay	Lanao del Norte	Iligan	8°25′00″N 124°05′00″E
Illana Bay	Zamboanga del Sur	Pagadian	7°32′51″N 123°28′10″E
Imorigue Bay	Palawan	El Nido	11°11′10″N 119°34′59″E
Imuruan Bay	Palawan	San Vicente	10°39′19″N 119°17′51″E
Inlulutoc Bay	Palawan	Taytay	10°53′35″N 119°14′22″E
Ipolote Bay	Palawan	Brooke's Point	8°46′00″N 117°49′12″E
Island Bay	Palawan	Narra	9°06′44″N 118°10′20″E
Janao Bay	Batangas	Bauan	13°46′33″N 120°54′39″E
J.B. Miller Bay	Cagayan	Gattaran	18°05′24″N 122°10′40″E
Jibboom Bay	Palawan	San Vicente	10°20′06″N 118°59′12″E
Kanlanuk Bay	Surigao del Norte	Socorro	9°39′57″N 125°54′52″E
Kauit Bay	Zamboanga del Norte	Sirawai	7°29′53″N 122°04′46″E
Komdong Bay	Palawan	San Vicente	10°29′24″N 119°15′06″E
Kulungan Bay	Davao del Sur	Santa Maria	6°34′47″N 125°29′27″E
Lalabugan Bay	Lanao del Sur	Kapatagan	7°24′52″N 124°09′08″E
Lamit Bay	Camarines Sur	Lagonoy	13°56′13″N 123°31′44″E
Lamon Bay	Quezon	Real	14°25′00″N 122°00′00″E
Langcan Bay	Palawan	Dumaran	10°31′22″N 119°54′30″E
Lanuza Bay	Surigao del Sur	Lanuza	9°17′01″N 126°04′01″E
Lapog Bay	Ilocos Sur	San Juan	17°44′29″N 120°25′44″E
Lauaan Bay	Eastern Samar	Lawaan	11°08′00″N 125°17′00″E
Leyte Bay	Leyte	Leyte	11°24′45″N 124°28′07″E
Lianga Bay	Surigao del Sur	Lianga	8°37′16″N 126°10′35″E
Libjo Bay	Dinagat Islands	Libjo	10°12′49″N 125°31′41″E
Libtong Bay	Samar	Villareal	11°28′35″N 124°53′42″E
Linao Bay	Maguindanao del Norte	Datu Blah T. Sinsuat	6°45′40″N 124°00′48″E
Litalit Bay	Surigao del Norte	San Benito	9°58′00″N 125°59′00″E
Lock Bay	Palawan	Araceli	10°42′59″N 120°15′41″E
Locsico Bay	Zamboanga Sibugay	Payao	7°27′04″N 122°46′57″E
Lolo Bay	Palawan	Aborlan	9°21′52″N 118°32′27″E
Looc Bay	Dinagat Islands	Loreto	10°22′57″N 125°34′52″E
Looc Bay	Masbate	Mandaon	12°10′01″N 123°15′15″E
Looc Bay	Mindoro Occidental	Looc	13°44′00″N 120°16′00″E
Looc Bay	Romblon	Looc	12°13′47″N 121°59′25″E
Look Sambang Bay	Basilan	Lamitan	6°41′11″N 122°09′45″E
Luchuan Bay	Palawan	Magsaysay	10°52′49″N 121°04′05″E
Lumotan Bay	Mindoro Occidental	Paluan	13°30′44″N 120°28′38″E
Macajalar Bay	Misamis Oriental	Cagayan de Oro	8°35′25″N 124°39′13″E
Magellan Bay	Cebu	Lapu-Lapu	10°19′51″N 124°01′12″E
Maglolobo Bay	Eastern Samar	Balangiga	11°05′25″N 125°21′14″E
Magnaga Bay	Davao de Oro	Pantukan	7°09′42″N 125°53′09″E
Maimbung Bay	Sulu	Maimbung	5°53′31″N 121°01′27″E
Malakibay Bay	Palawan	Rizal	9°00′43″N 117°36′41″E
Malalag Bay	Davao del Sur	Malalag	6°36′30″N 125°25′01″E
Malaluton Bay	Palawan	Taytay	10°51′53″N 119°24′10″E
Malanut Bay	Palawan	Sofronio Española	9°02′00″N 118°02′00″E
Maligay Bay	Zamboanga del Sur	Vincenzo A. Sagun	7°30′00″N 123°14′00″E
Maluso Bay	Basilan	Maluso	6°33′20″N 121°51′10″E
Mamburao Bay	Mindoro Occidental	Mamburao	13°10′21″N 120°36′49″E
Manay Bay	Davao Oriental	Manay	7°11′53″N 126°33′11″E
Mangarin Bay	Mindoro Occidental	San Jose	12°19′18″N 121°02′56″E
Manila Bay	Metro Manila	Manila	14°31′00″N 120°46′00″E
Mansalay Bay	Mindoro Oriental	Mansalay	12°30′43″N 121°26′45″E
Mansiol Bay	Mindoro Oriental	Mansalay	12°27′48″N 121°26′00″E
Mantaquin Bay	Palawan	Narra	9°14′16″N 118°24′11″E
Mapanga Bay	Davao de Oro	Pantukan	7°00′47″N 125°57′57″E
Maqueda Bay	Samar	San Sebastian	11°43′21″N 124°58′07″E
Maria Bay	Siquijor	Maria	9°11′16″N 123°41′12″E
Maribojoc Bay	Bohol	Maribojoc	9°42′23″N 123°49′26″E
Marlanga Bay	Marinduque	Torrijos	13°16′07″N 122°03′03″E
Marofinas Bay	Palawan	Puerto Princesa	10°16′28″N 118°56′50″E
Matarinao Bay	Eastern Samar	Quinapondan	11°12′22″N 125°33′57″E
Mayday Bay	Palawan	San Vicente	10°26′15″N 119°04′16″E
Mayo Bay	Davao Oriental	Mati	6°55′55″N 126°24′50″E
Melgar Bay	Dinagat Islands	Basilisa	10°03′18″N 125°33′27″E
Mesecoy Bay	Palawan	Taytay	10°59′20″N 119°31′12″E
Monkiaua Bay	Davao del Sur	Santa Maria	6°33′39″N 125°30′19″E
Murcielagos Bay	Zamboanga del Norte	Sibutad	8°39′01″N 123°33′34″E
Nabulao Bay	Negros Occidental	Sipalay	9°38′36″N 122°26′38″E
Nagabungan Bay	Ilocos Norte	Burgos	18°29′01″N 120°33′48″E
Nakoda Bay	Palawan	Quezon	9°16′47″N 117°57′12″E
Nangan Bay	Davao Oriental	Governor Generoso	6°27′42″N 126°06′45″E
Naro Bay	Masbate	Dimasalang	12°13′59″N 123°50′37″E
Nin Bay	Masbate	Mandaon	12°13′25″N 123°15′39″E
Nonoc Bay	Masbate	Claveria	12°54′55″N 123°11′54″E
North Bais Bay	Negros Oriental	Bais	9°37′38″N 123°08′10″E
North Bay	Palawan	Linapacan	11°29′14″N 119°48′35″E
Nunuyan Bay	Zamboanga del Norte	Siocon	7°47′11″N 122°06′54″E
Odiongan Bay	Romblon	Odiongan	12°24′40″N 121°58′45″E
Ormoc Bay	Leyte	Ormoc	10°57′00″N 124°36′00″E
Oyon Bay	Zambales	Masinloc	15°33′55″N 119°56′23″E
Pagadian Bay	Zamboanga del Sur	Pagadian	7°49′00″N 123°30′53″E
Pagapas Bay	Batangas	Calatagan	13°50′35″N 120°40′17″E
Pagdanan Bay	Palawan	San Vicente	10°31′44″N 119°08′38″E
Palanan Bay	Isabela	Palanan	17°09′13″N 122°27′16″E
Palauig Bay	Zambales	Palauig	15°26′58″N 119°54′12″E
Paluan Bay	Mindoro Occidental	Paluan	13°23′41″N 120°25′44″E
Paly Bay	Palawan	Taytay	10°43′45″N 119°40′51″E
Pampanga Bay	Pampanga and Bataan	Sasmuan	14°47′19″N 120°35′27″E
Panabutan Bay	Zamboanga del Norte	Sirawai	7°34′26″N 122°07′54″E
Panag Bay	Surigao del Norte	Tagana-an	9°44′55″N 125°34′51″E
Panagule Bay	Palawan	Balabac	7°51′35″N 117°04′07″E
Pandan Bay	Antique	Pandan	11°42′46″N 122°04′58″E
Pandan Bay	Catanduanes	Pandan	14°04′12″N 124°09′29″E
Panglao Bay	Bohol	Panglao	9°33′40″N 123°44′11″E
Panguil Bay	Misamis Occidental and Lanao del Norte	Tangub	8°01′06″N 123°43′29″E
Paracale Bay	Camarines Norte	Paracale	14°17′26″N 122°47′36″E
Pasaleng Bay	Ilocos Norte	Pagudpud	18°35′15″N 120°56′01″E
Pasig Bay	Palawan	Balabac	7°50′36″N 116°59′24″E
Patauag Bay	Zamboanga del Norte	Labason	8°07′58″N 122°35′04″E
Paypayan Bay	Misamis Occidental	Oroquieta	8°30′40″N 123°46′54″E
Peris Bay	Quezon	Buenavista	13°42′40″N 122°29′36″E
Pilar Bay	Capiz	Pilar	11°34′33″N 122°56′55″E
Pilar Bay	Sorsogon	Pilar	12°54′09″N 123°39′51″E
Pitogo Bay	Camarines Sur	Caramoan	13°46′52″N 123°57′01″E
Pitogo Bay	Sulu	Kalingalan Caluang	5°53′02″N 121°19′41″E
Pola Bay	Mindoro Oriental	Pola	13°09′24″N 121°28′11″E
Polillo Bay	Quezon	Polillo	14°44′03″N 121°55′22″E
Poliqui Bay	Albay	Legazpi	13°07′16″N 123°48′40″E
Port Ciego Bay	Palawan	Balabac	8°02′19″N 116°58′46″E
Puerto Princesa Bay	Palawan	Puerto Princesa	9°43′39″N 118°42′58″E
Puga Bay	Palawan	San Vicente	10°17′49″N 118°57′44″E
Pujada Bay	Davao Oriental	Mati	6°53′29″N 126°13′38″E
Rizal Bay	Palawan	Magsaysay	10°53′07″N 121°02′48″E
Sadam Bay	Maguindanao del Norte	Datu Blah T. Sinsuat	6°47′03″N 123°58′12″E
Saint Paul Bay	Palawan	Puerto Princesa	10°13′45″N 118°55′06″E
San Angel Bay	Quezon	Calauag	14°09′04″N 122°10′47″E
San Antonio Bay	Palawan	Bataraza	8°35′54″N 117°36′20″E
San Isidro Bay	Leyte	San Isidro	11°24′05″N 124°20′13″E
San Juan Bay	Palawan	Dumaran	10°26′48″N 119°47′01″E
San Miguel Bay	Camarines Sur	Calabanga	13°51′18″N 123°11′04″E
San Pedro and San Pablo Bay	Leyte and Samar	Tacloban	11°10′37″N 125°06′28″E
San Pedro Bay	Palawan	Culion	11°50′43″N 120°02′35″E
San Rafael Bay	Basilan	Isabela	6°40′38″N 121°55′52″E
Santa Ana Bay	Guimaras	Nueva Valencia	10°33′00″N 122°32′00″E
Santa Cruz Bay	Palawan	San Vicente	10°24′22″N 119°03′37″E
Santol Bay	Camarines Norte	Santa Elena	14°13′17″N 122°22′05″E
Sapenitan Bay	Camarines Sur	Siruma	14°02′49″N 123°15′33″E
Sapian Bay	Capiz	Sapian	11°31′52″N 122°37′02″E
Sarangani Bay	Sarangani and South Cotabato	General Santos	6°03′33″N 125°12′48″E
Sayao Bay	Marinduque	Mogpog	13°33′01″N 121°54′39″E
Shark Fin Bay	Palawan	El Nido	11°07′22″N 119°35′25″E
Sibuco Bay	Zamboanga del Norte	Sibuco	7°18′11″N 122°02′53″E
Sibuguey Bay	Zamboanga Sibugay	Ipil	7°30′00″N 122°40′00″E
Sigayan Bay	Batangas	San Juan	13°39′47″N 121°23′35″E
Sigayan Bay	Zamboanga del Sur	Tukuran	7°43′21″N 123°45′28″E
Silad Bay	Leyte	Villaba	11°14′11″N 124°23′23″E
Silanga Bay	Palawan	El Nido	11°00′55″N 119°34′50″E
Sindangan Bay	Zamboanga del Norte	Sindangan	8°13′11″N 122°57′48″E
Siocon Bay	Zamboanga del Norte	Siocon	7°39′21″N 122°07′31″E
Siruma Bay	Camarines Sur	Siruma	14°00′45″N 123°13′09″E
Sisiran Bay	Camarines Sur	Garchitorena	13°54′27″N 123°40′34″E
Sogod Bay	Cebu	Sogod	10°45′25″N 124°01′01″E
Sogod Bay	Southern Leyte	Sogod	10°13′03″N 125°01′56″E
Soguicay Bay	Mindoro Oriental	Bulalacao	12°20′12″N 121°24′29″E
Sohutan Bay	Surigao del Norte	Socorro	9°36′06″N 125°53′58″E
Solvec Bay	Ilocos Sur	Narvacan	17°26′36″N 120°26′45″E
Sombocogon Bay	Quezon	San Andres	13°16′22″N 122°40′56″E
Sorsogon Bay	Sorsogon	Sorsogon	12°53′37″N 123°58′43″E
South Bais Bay	Negros Oriental	Bais	9°33′47″N 123°08′17″E
South Bay	Palawan	Linapacan	11°24′27″N 119°47′54″E
Sua Bay	Samar	Daram	11°33′43″N 124°47′22″E
Subang Bay	Palawan	Araceli	10°38′22″N 120°14′42″E
Subic Bay	Zambales	Subic	14°45′00″N 120°13′00″E
Sugot Bay	Sorsogon	Sorsogon	13°02′06″N 124°05′05″E
Sugut Bay	Maguindanao del Norte	Parang	7°24′13″N 124°14′00″E
Tabaco Bay	Albay	Tabaco	13°19′44″N 123°48′26″E
Tabango Bay	Leyte	Tabango	11°18′06″N 124°21′58″E
Tabogon Bay	Cebu	Tabogon	10°56′23″N 124°02′17″E
Tabuan Bay	Cagayan	Baggao	18°05′16″N 122°11′15″E
Tagabas Bay	Quezon	Catanauan	13°35′45″N 122°15′45″E
Tagabibi Bay	Davao Oriental	Governor Generoso	6°23′49″N 126°08′04″E
Tagabuli Bay	Davao del Sur	Santa Cruz	6°48′06″N 125°23′16″E
Tagcawayan Bay	Quezon	Tagkawayan	13°56′20″N 122°32′37″E
Taguaya Bay	Palawan	Quezon	9°06′57″N 117°45′30″E
Tagugsom Bay	Palawan	Rizal	8°37′14″N 117°16′09″E
Tagun Bay	Camarines Sur	Caramoan	13°55′25″N 123°46′24″E
Takut Tangug Bay	Basilan	Tuburan	6°32′01″N 122°14′38″E
Talavera Bay	Cebu	Toledo	10°24′58″N 123°39′37″E
Talin Bay	Batangas	Lian	13°58′54″N 120°36′24″E
Talisay Bay	Davao Oriental	San Isidro	6°44′12″N 126°05′19″E
Talomo Bay	Davao del Sur	Davao City	7°01′50″N 125°33′15″E
Tambac Bay	Pangasinan	Anda	16°15′02″N 119°57′01″E
Tantanang Bay	Zamboanga Sibugay	Alicia	7°30′48″N 122°54′23″E
Tayabas Bay	Quezon	Lucena	13°45′00″N 121°45′02″E
Taytay Bay	Palawan	Taytay	10°52′48″N 119°33′27″E
Tinintinan Bay	Palawan	Araceli	10°34′27″N 119°59′39″E
Tolong Bay	Negros Oriental	Bayawan	9°19′05″N 122°51′27″E
Torrijos Bay	Marinduque	Torrijos	13°19′20″N 122°05′36″E
Treacherous Bay	Palawan	Quezon	9°19′13″N 118°03′58″E
Tubajon Bay	Dinagat Islands	Tubajon	10°20′07″N 125°32′54″E
Tulariquin Bay	Palawan	Roxas	10°08′24″N 119°14′01″E
Tumarbong Bay	Palawan	Roxas	10°22′12″N 119°27′38″E
Tuna Bay	Sultan Kudarat	Palimbang	6°22′57″N 124°04′23″E
Tungauan Bay	Zamboanga Sibugay	Tungawan	7°26′15″N 122°22′11″E
Turung Bay	Palawan	El Nido	10°52′38″N 119°17′15″E
Tutu Bay	Sulu	Talipao	5°56′03″N 121°11′56″E
Ulan Bay	Marinduque	Mogpog	13°30′41″N 121°50′58″E
Ulugan Bay	Palawan	Puerto Princesa	10°05′06″N 118°47′49″E
Uson Bay	Masbate	Uson	12°12′55″N 123°46′48″E
Varadero Bay	Mindoro Oriental	Puerto Galera	13°29′02″N 120°58′30″E
Villareal Bay	Samar	Villareal	11°37′31″N 124°56′53″E

== Map ==
Oceans and Seas in the Philippines

== See also ==
- Geography of the Philippines
- Outline of the Philippines
