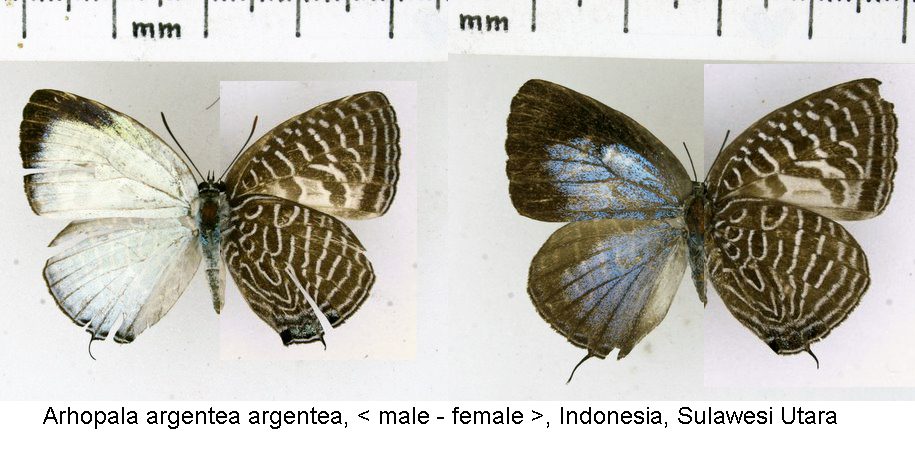
- male, female, set specimens, Indonesia

Scientific classification
- Kingdom: Animalia
- Phylum: Arthropoda
- Clade: Pancrustacea
- Class: Insecta
- Order: Lepidoptera
- Family: Lycaenidae
- Genus: Arhopala
- Species: A. argentea

Binomial name
- Arhopala argentea Staudinger, 1888

= Arhopala argentea =

Species of butterfly

Arhopala argentea, is a butterfly in the family Lycaenidae. It was described by Otto Staudinger in 1888. It is found in the Indomalayan realm where it is found in Celebes and the Philippines.

== Description ==
Looks beneath almost exactly like sangira, but it is at once discernible by the mother-of-pearl white upper surface showing lilac or greenish reflections in a certain light. Margin and apex of forewing blackish, thus superficially resembling the colouring of some Lampides, even of small Pieridae.

== Subspecies ==
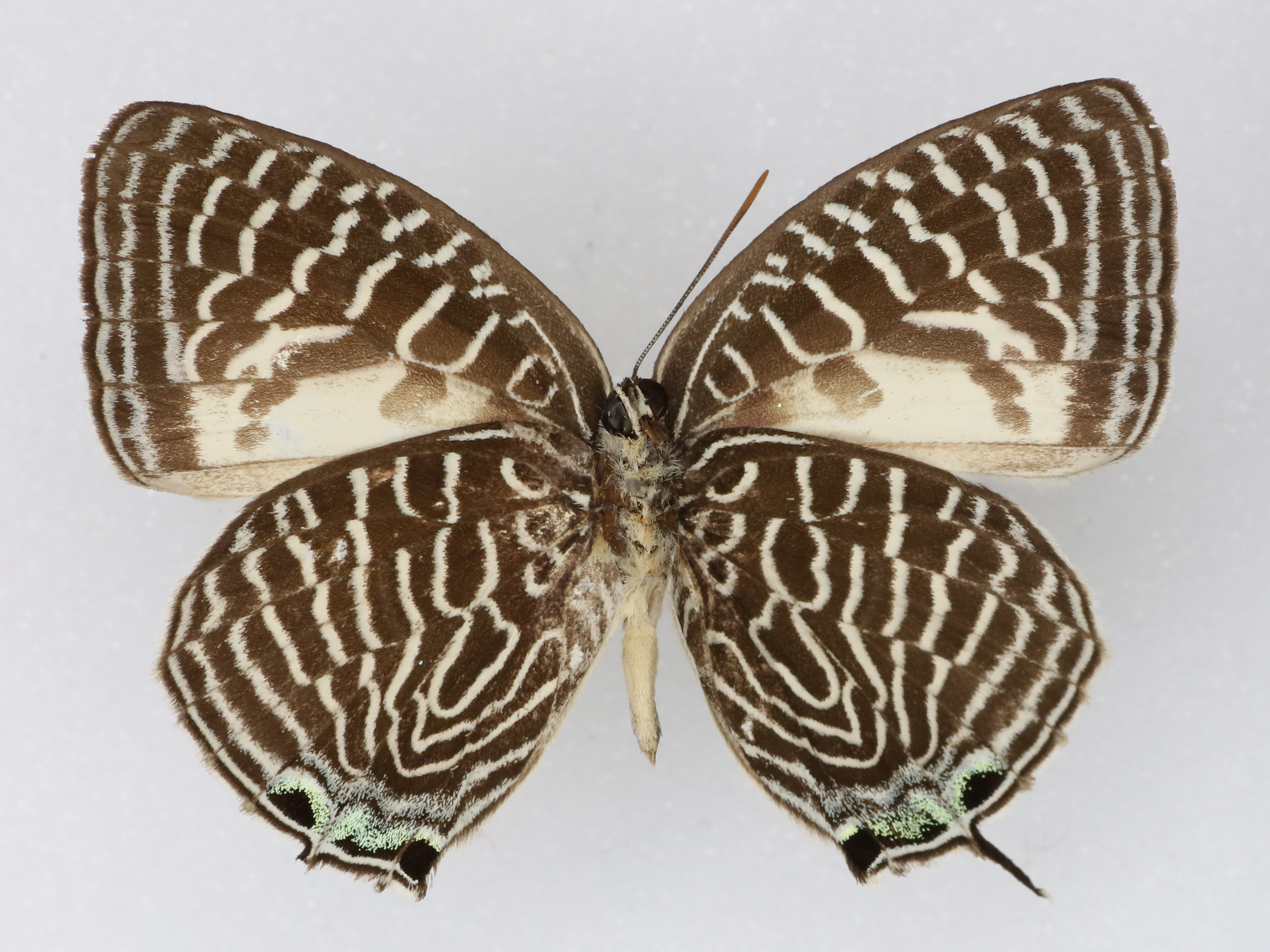
Arhopala argentea verityae holotype, in the Natural History Museum, London

- A. a. argentea Celebes
- A. a. boordi Tennent & Rawlins, 2010
- A. a. verityae Tennent & Rawlins, 2010
