= Delias ottonia =

Scientific classification
- Kingdom: Animalia
- Phylum: Arthropoda
- Class: Insecta
- Order: Lepidoptera
- Family: Pieridae
- Genus: Delias
- Species: D. ottonia

Binomial name
- Delias ottonia Semper, 1890

Species of butterfly

Delias ottonia is a species of pierine butterfly endemic to Mindanao in the Philippines.

The wingspan is 73–80 mm.

== Subspecies ==
- Delias ottonia ottonia (Mindanao)
- Delias ottonia semperorum Schroeder & Treadaway, 2009 (Basilan Island)
- Delias ottonia surigaoensis Yagishita & Morita, 1996 (Tandag, Surigao, northern Mindanao)
