= Geography of the Philippines =

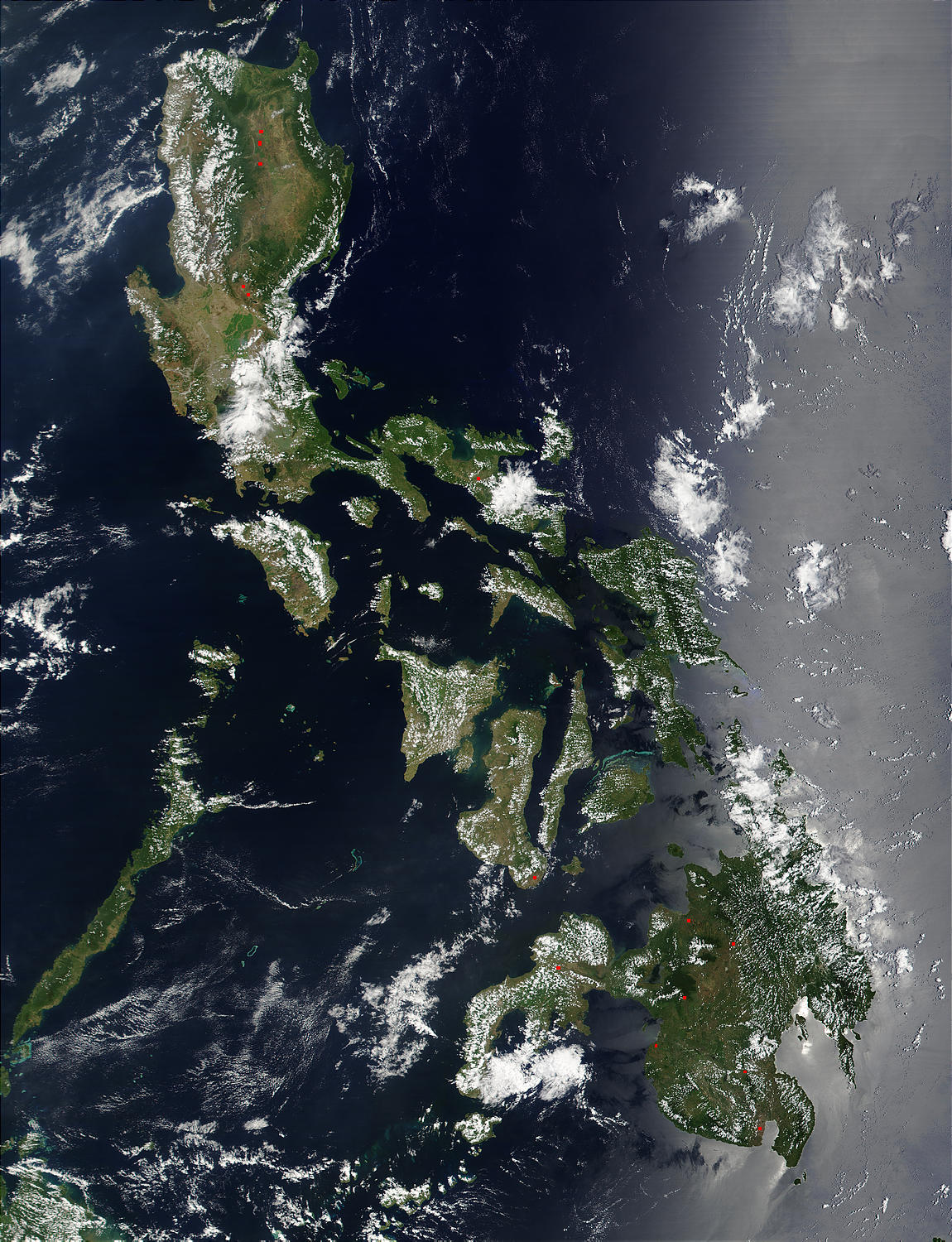
- Continent: Asia
- Region: Southeast Asia
- Coordinates: 13°00'N 122°00'E
- Area: Ranked 72nd
  - Total: 300,000 km^{2} (120,000 sq mi)
  - Land: 99.38%
  - Water: 0.62%
- Coastline: 36,289 km (22,549 mi)
- Borders: None
- Highest point: Mount Apo; 2,954 meters (9,692 ft)
- Lowest point: Emden Deep; 10,540 meters (34,580 ft) (sea level)
- Longest river: Cagayan River
- Largest lake: Laguna de Bay
- Exclusive economic zone: 2,263,816 km^{2} (874,064 mi^{2})

The Philippines is an archipelago that comprises 7,641 islands, (Note: The count of islands was pegged at 7,107 in 1945, and was updated to 7,641 in 2017 after the Philippine National Mapping and Resource Information Authority (NAMRIA) announced that it had identified 400 to 500 additional land features that might be considered islands.) and with a total land area of 300,000 square kilometers (115,831 sq mi), it is the world's fifth largest island country. The eleven largest islands contain 95% of the total land area. The largest of these islands is Luzon at about 105,000 square kilometers (40,541 sq mi). The next largest island is Mindanao at about 95,000 square kilometers (36,680 sq mi). The archipelago is around 800 kilometers (500 mi) from the Asian mainland and is located between Taiwan and Borneo.

The Philippine archipelago is divided into three Island groups: Luzon, the Visayas, and Mindanao. The Luzon islands include Luzon itself, Palawan, Mindoro, Marinduque, Masbate, Romblon, Catanduanes, Batanes, and Polillo. The Visayas is a group of islands in the central Philippines, the largest of which are: Panay, Negros, Cebu, Bohol, Leyte, Samar, Siquijor, Biliran, and Guimaras. The Mindanao islands include Mindanao itself, Dinagat, Siargao, Camiguin, Samal, plus the Sulu Archipelago, composed primarily of Basilan, Sulu, and Tawi-Tawi.

The Philippines lies between 4° 40' and 21° 10' N North (N) latitude 116° 40', and 126° 34' East (E) longitude

== Physical geography ==
Philippine archipelago, drawn by the Jesuit Father Pedro Murillo Velarde (1696--1753)

The Philippine archipelago lies in Southeast Asia, and numbers some 7,641 islands. The Philippines occupies an area that stretches for 1,850 kilometers (1,150 mi) from about the fifth to the twentieth parallels north latitude. The total land area is 300,000 square kilometers (115,831 sq mi), with cadastral survey data suggesting it may be larger. This makes it the fifth largest island country in the world. Only approximately 1,000 of its islands are populated, and fewer than one-half of these are larger than 2.5 square kilometers (1 sq mi). Eleven islands make up 95 percent of the Philippine landmass, and two of these — Luzon and Mindanao — measure 105,000 square kilometers (40,541 sq mi) and 95,000 square kilometers (36,680 sq mi), respectively. They, together with the cluster of islands in Visayas in between them, represent the three principal regions of the archipelago that are identified by the three stars on the Philippine flag. The Philippines is broken up into many islands by the sea. This gives it the fifth longest coastline of 36,289 kilometers (22,549 mi) in the world. The Exclusive economic zone of the Philippines covers 2,263,816 km^{2} (874,064 sq mi), 200 nautical miles (370 km) from its shores. It is located between 116° 40', and 126° 34' E longitude and 4° 40' and 21° 10' N latitude and is bordered by the Philippine Sea to the east, the South China Sea to the west, and the Celebes Sea to the south. The island of Borneo is located a few hundred kilometers southwest and Taiwan is located directly to the north. The Moluccas and Sulawesi are located to the south-southwest and Palau is located to the east of the islands.

Off the coast of eastern Mindanao is the Philippine Trench, which descends to a depth of 10,430 meters (34,220 ft). The Philippines is part of a western Pacific arc system characterized by active volcanoes. Among the most notable peaks are Mount Mayon near Legazpi City, Taal Volcano south of Manila, and Mount Apo in Mindanao. All of the Philippine islands are prone to earthquakes. The northern Luzon highlands, or Cordillera Central, rise to between 2,500 meters (8,200 ft) and 2,750 meters (9,020 ft), and, together with the Sierra Madre in the northeastern portion of Luzon and the mountains of Mindanao, boast rainforests that provide refuge for numerous upland tribal groups. The rainforests also offer prime habitat for more than 500 species of birds, including the Philippine eagle (or monkey-eating eagle), some 1,100 species of orchids, and some 8,500 species of flowering plants.

The longest river is the Cagayan River in northern Luzon, measuring about 520 kilometers (320 mi). Manila Bay, upon the shore of which the capital city of Manila lies, is connected to Laguna de Bay, the largest lake in the Philippines, by the Pasig River. Subic Bay, Davao Gulf, and the Moro Gulf are other important bays. The San Juanico Strait separates the islands of Samar and Leyte but it is traversed by the San Juanico Bridge. The Puerto Princesa Subterranean River, which runs 8.2 kilometers (5.1 mi) underground through a karst landscape before reaching the ocean, is a UNESCO World Heritage Site.

Other extensive river systems are the Pulangi River, which flows into the Mindanao River (Rio Grande de Mindanao); the Agusan, in Mindanao which flows north into the Mindanao Sea; and the Pampanga, which flows south from east Central Luzon into Manila Bay. Several rivers have been harnessed for hydroelectric power.

A global remote sensing analysis suggested in 2018 that there were 2,126 km^{2} (821 sq mi) of tidal flats in the Philippines and is therefore ranked as the 15th country in terms of how much tidal flat occurs there.

To protect the country's biological resources, the government has taken a first step of preparing a Biodiversity Action Plan to address conservation of threatened species.

Most of the islands used to be covered by tropical rainforests. However, illegal logging has reduced forest cover to less than 10% of the total land area.

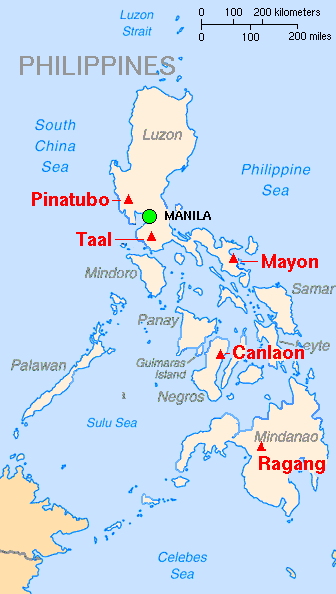
Major volcanoes in the Philippines

=== Geology ===
The Philippine Archipelago is geologically part of the Philippine Mobile Belt located between the Philippine Sea Plate, the South China Sea Basin of the Eurasian Plate, and the Sunda Plate. The Philippine Trench (also called the Mindanao Trench) is a submarine trench 1,320 kilometers (820 mi) in length found directly east of the Philippine Mobile Belt and is the result of a collision of tectonic plates. The Philippine Sea Plate is subducting under the Philippine Mobile Belt at the rate of about 16 centimeters (6.3 in) per year. The Philippine Fault System consists of a series of seismic faults that produce several earthquakes per year, most of which are not felt. The Galathea Depth in the Philippine Trench is the deepest point in the country and the third deepest in the world. The trench is located in the Philippine Sea.

The islands are composed of volcanic, coral, principal rock formations. Twelve main forest formations are classified, which are the Mangrove forest, Beach forest, Freshwater swamp forest, Peat swamp forest, Molave forest (Forest over Limestone), Bonsai forest (Forest over Ultramafic rocks), Tropical semi-evergreen rainforest, Tropical moist deciduous forest, Dipterocarp forest (Tropical lowland evergreen rainforest), Tropical lower montane rainforest, Mossy forest (tropical upper montane rainforest), and Tropical sub-alpine forest. The highest mountain is Mount Apo. It measures up to 2,954 meters (9,692 ft) above sea level and is located on the island of Mindanao. The second highest point can be found on Mindanao as well, at Mount Dulang-dulang, a peak 2,941 meters (9,649 ft) above sea level.

Situated on the western fringes of the Pacific Ring of Fire, the Philippines experiences frequent seismic and volcanic activity. The Benham Plateau to the east in the Philippine Sea is an undersea region active in tectonic subduction. Around 20 earthquakes are registered daily, though most are too weak to be felt. The last major earthquake was the 1990 Luzon earthquake. There are many active volcanoes such as the Mayon Volcano, Mount Pinatubo, and Taal Volcano. The eruption of Mount Pinatubo in June 1991 produced the second largest terrestrial eruption of the 20th century. The Philippines is the world's second-biggest geothermal energy producer behind the United States, with 18% of the country's electricity needs being met by geothermal power.

Mount Pinatubo is notorious for its destructive VEI-6 eruption on June 15, 1991. Taal Volcano, one of the Decade Volcanoes, had a VEI-3.7 eruption on January 12, 2020. Mount Mayon is renowned for having an almost perfect cone, but has a violent history of 47 eruptions since 1616 and its VEI-4 eruption on June 23, 1897, rained fire for seven days.

Significant mineral deposits exist as a result of the country's complex geologic structure and high level of seismic activity. These deposites are considered highly valuable. The country is thought to have the second-largest gold deposits after South Africa, along with a large amount of copper deposits. Palladium, originally discovered in South America, was found to have the world's largest deposits in the Philippines too. Romblon island is a source of high-quality marble. Other minerals include chromite, nickel, and zinc. Despite this, a lack of law enforcement, poor management, opposition due to the presence of indigenous communities, and past instances of environmental damages and disasters, have resulted in these mineral resources remaining largely untapped.

=== Topography ===
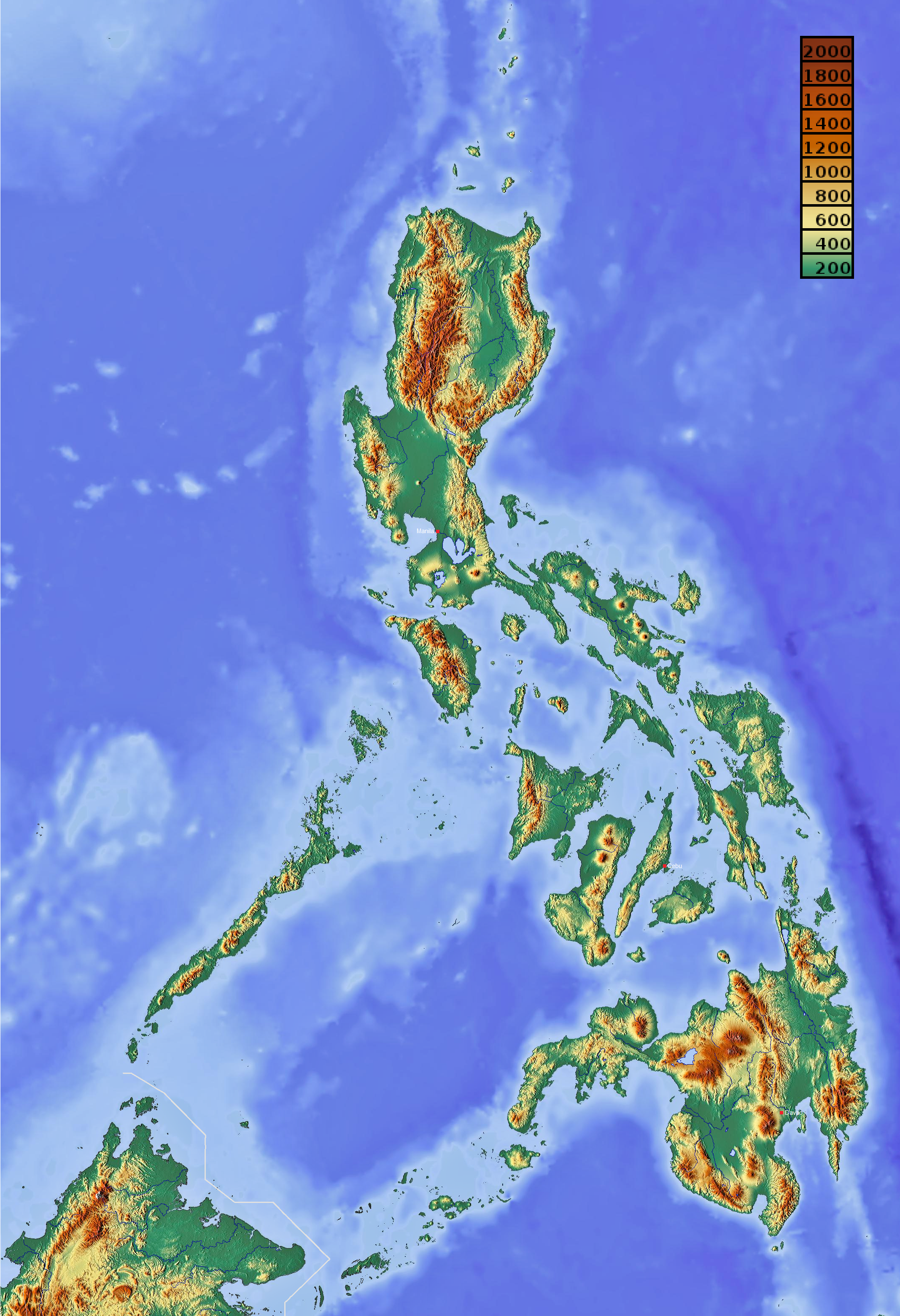
Major geographic features of the Philippines

1	Batanes group of islands
2	Babuyan group of islands
3	Cordillera mountains
4	Cagayan valley
5	Sierra Madre mountains
6	Caraballo mountains
7	Zambales mountains
8	Central Luzon plain
9	Sierra Madre (southern tip)
10	Polillo group of islands
11	Bicol peninsula
12	Mindoro island
13	Romblon group of islands
14	Masbate island
15	Samar island

16	Palawan group of islands
17	Panay island
18	Negros island
19	Cebu island
20	Bohol island
21	Leyte island
22	Zamboanga peninsula
23	Bukidnon-Lanao plateau
24	Davao-Agusan Trough
25	Diwata mountains
26	Cotabato Basin
27	Central Mindanao highlands
28	Pacific Cordillera mountains
29	Tiruray highlands
30	Sulu archipelago

=== Luzon ===
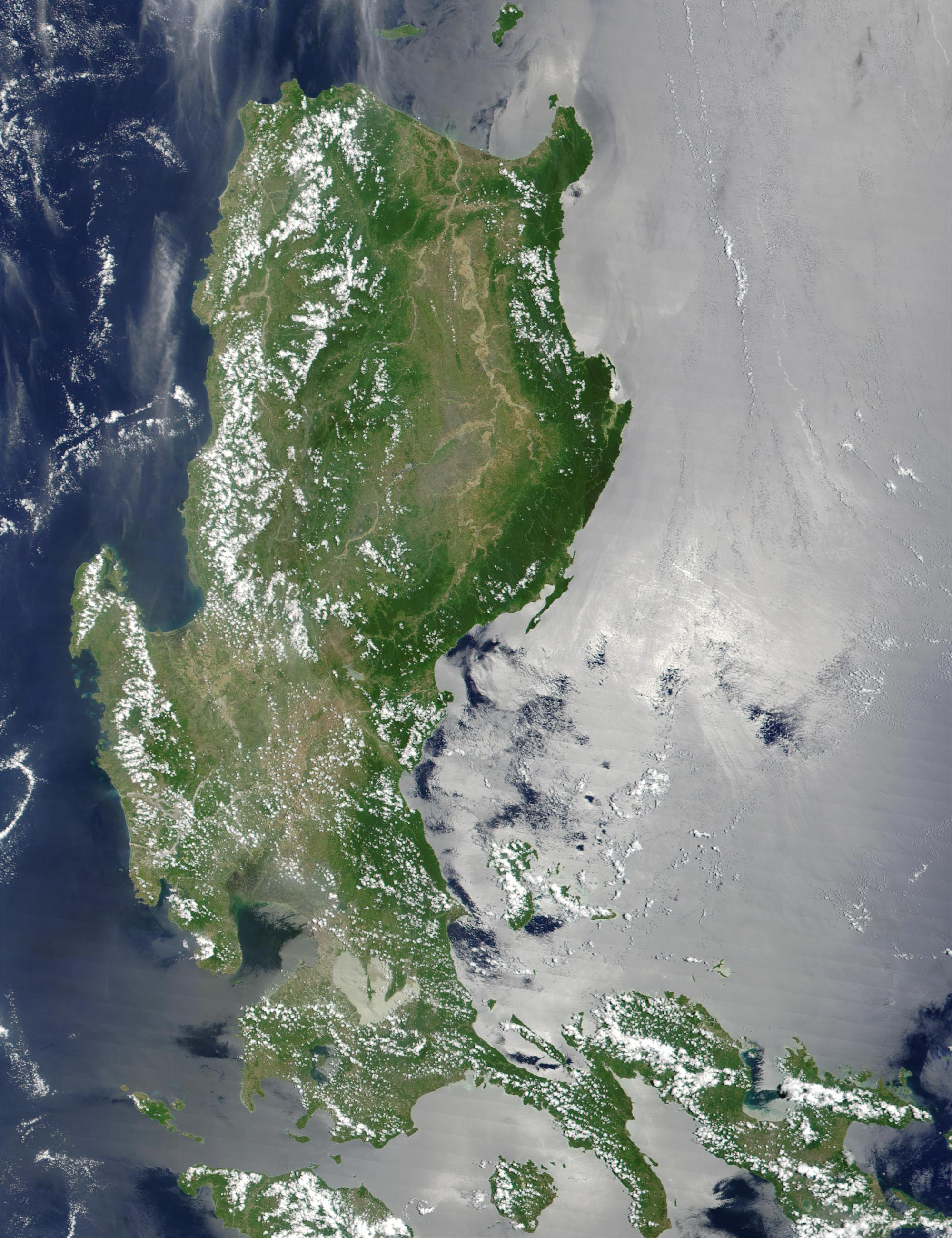
Luzon in a satellite image

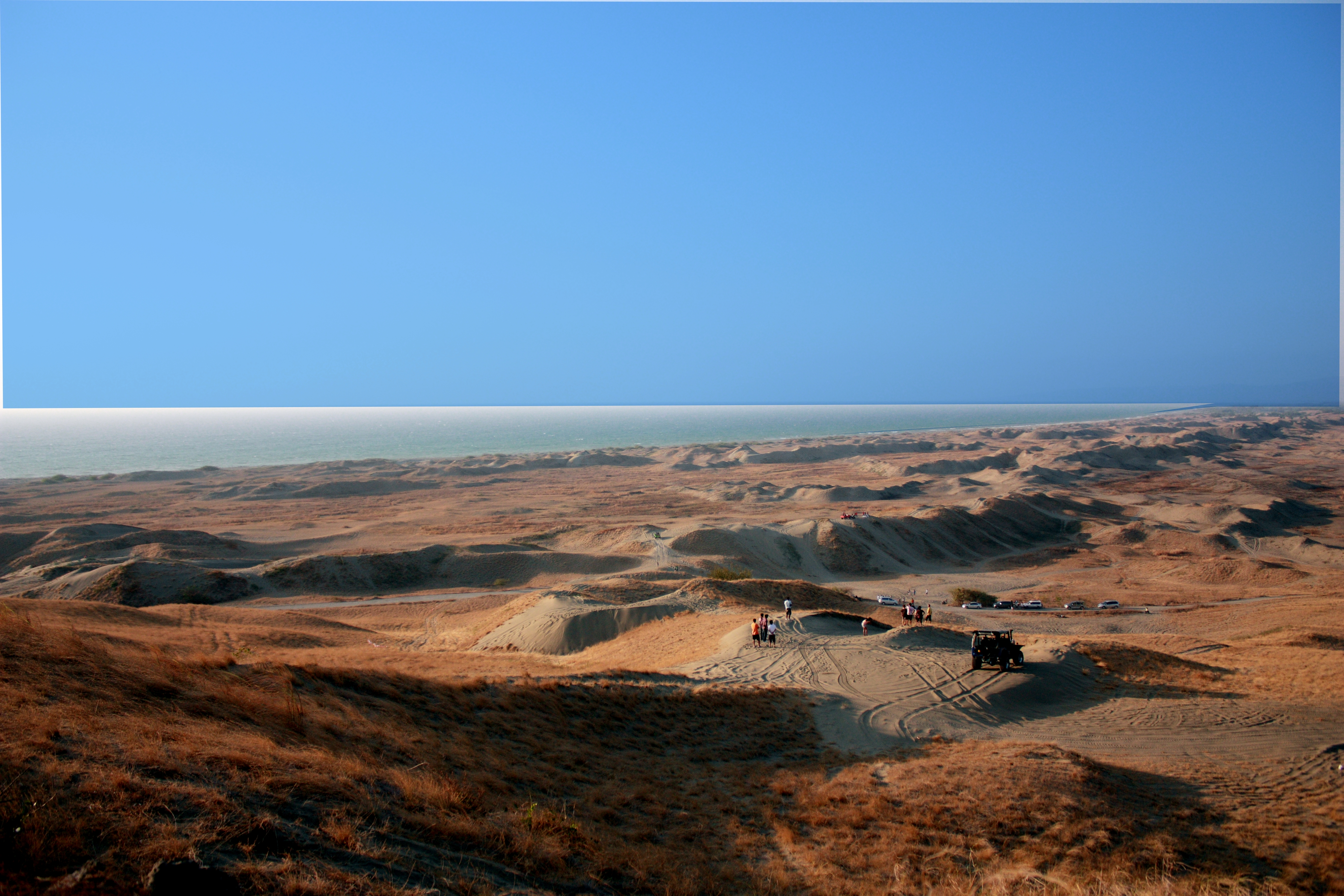
The La Paz sand dunes in Laoag, part of the Ilocos coastline

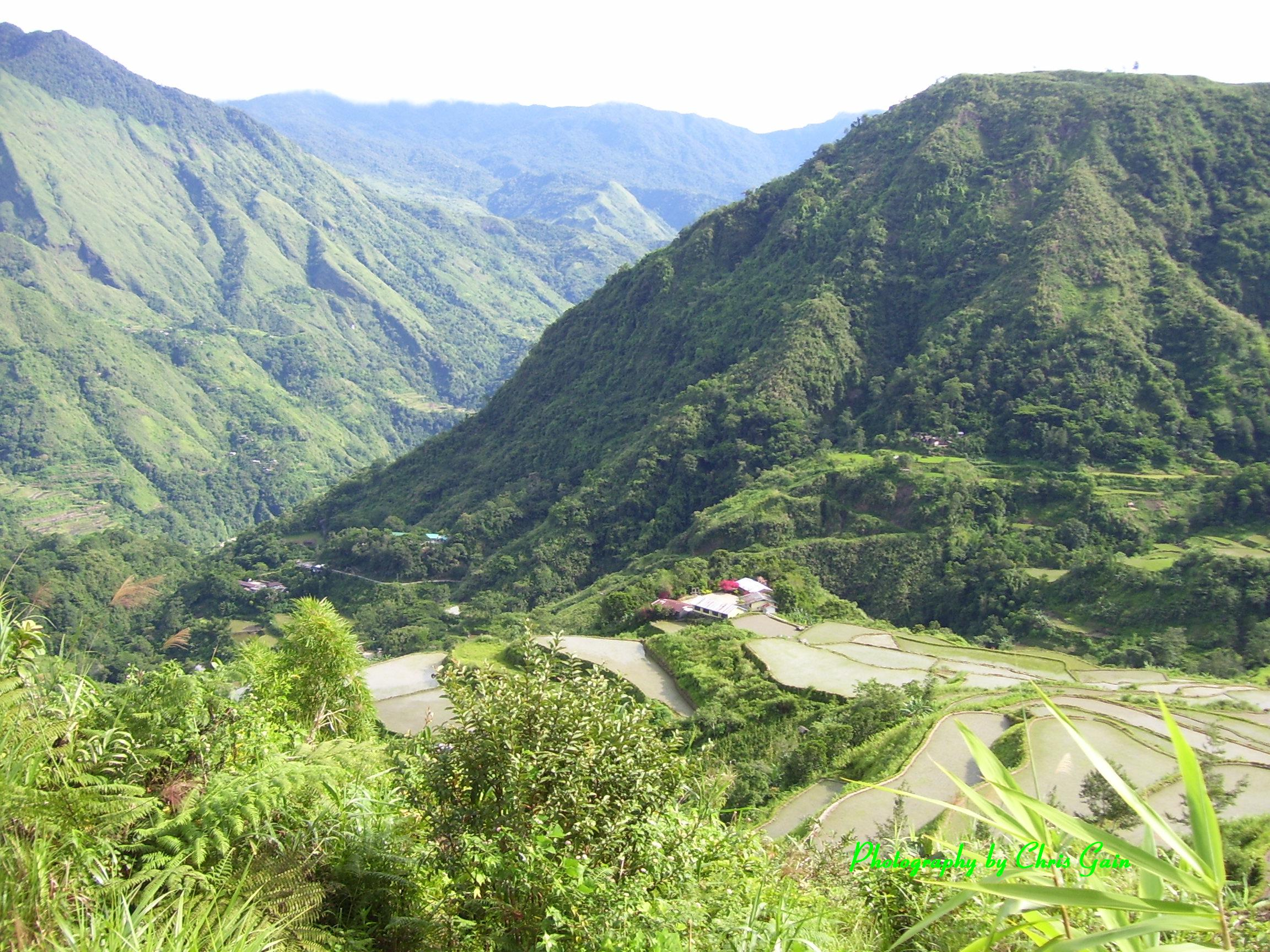
Pasil Valley in Kalinga of the Cordillera Central

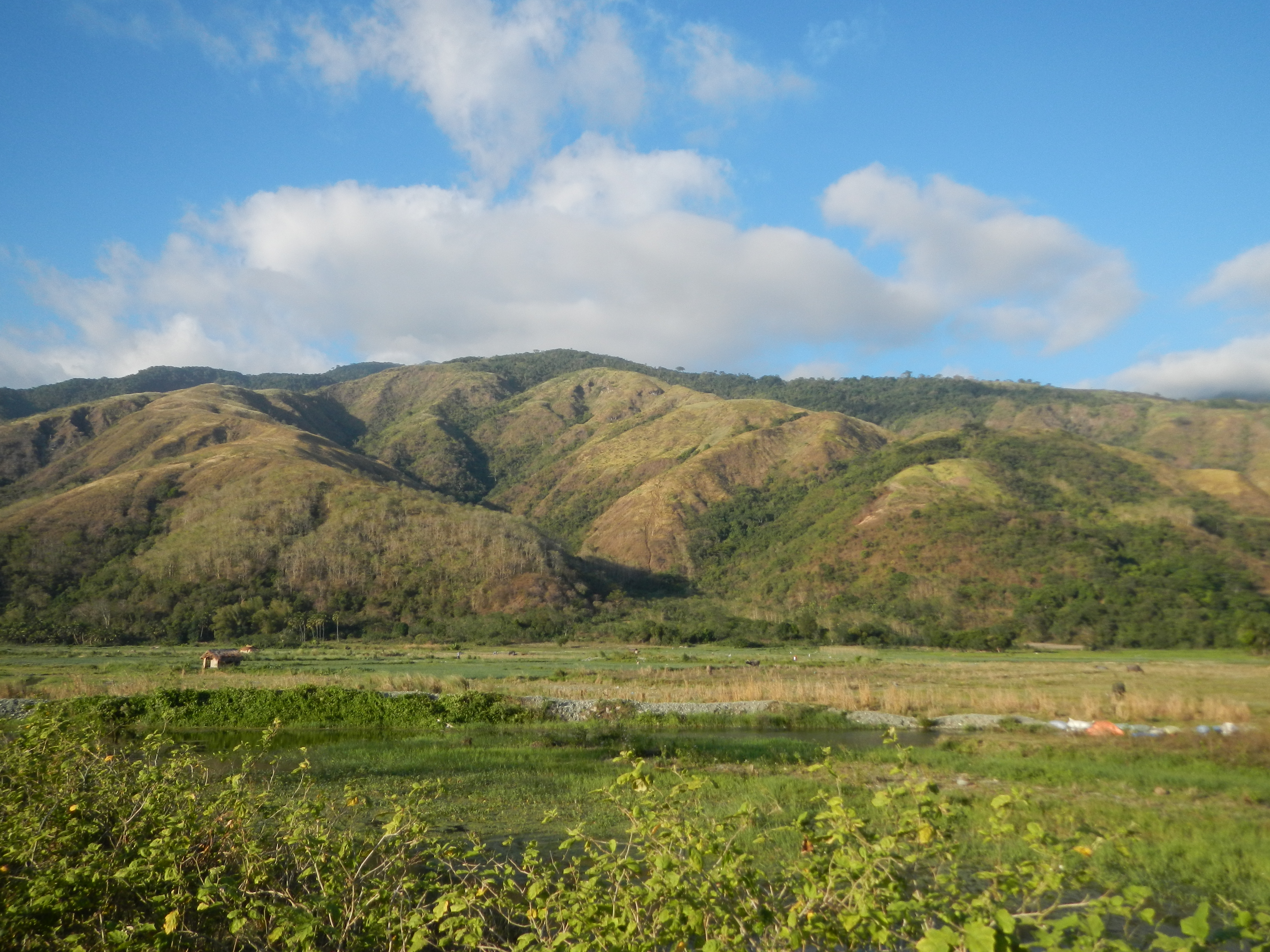
The Sierra Madre Mountains viewed from Gabaldon

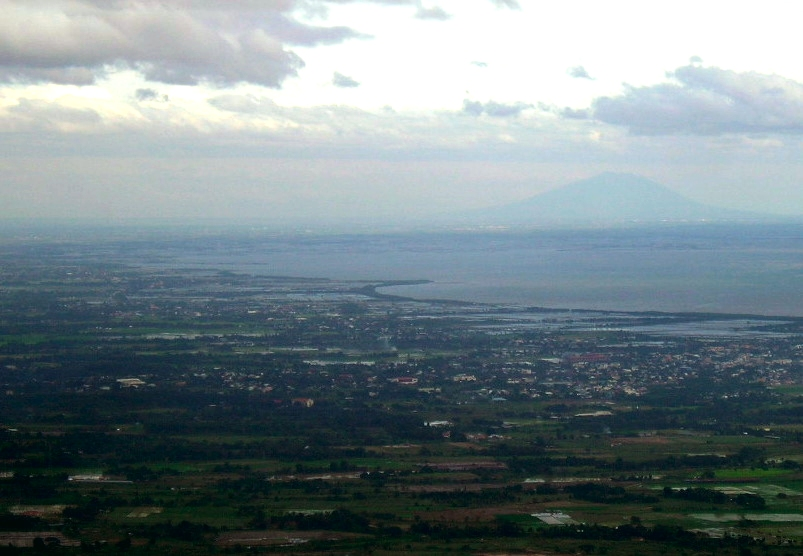
The plains of Central Luzon, showing Manila Bay with Mount Arayat in the background

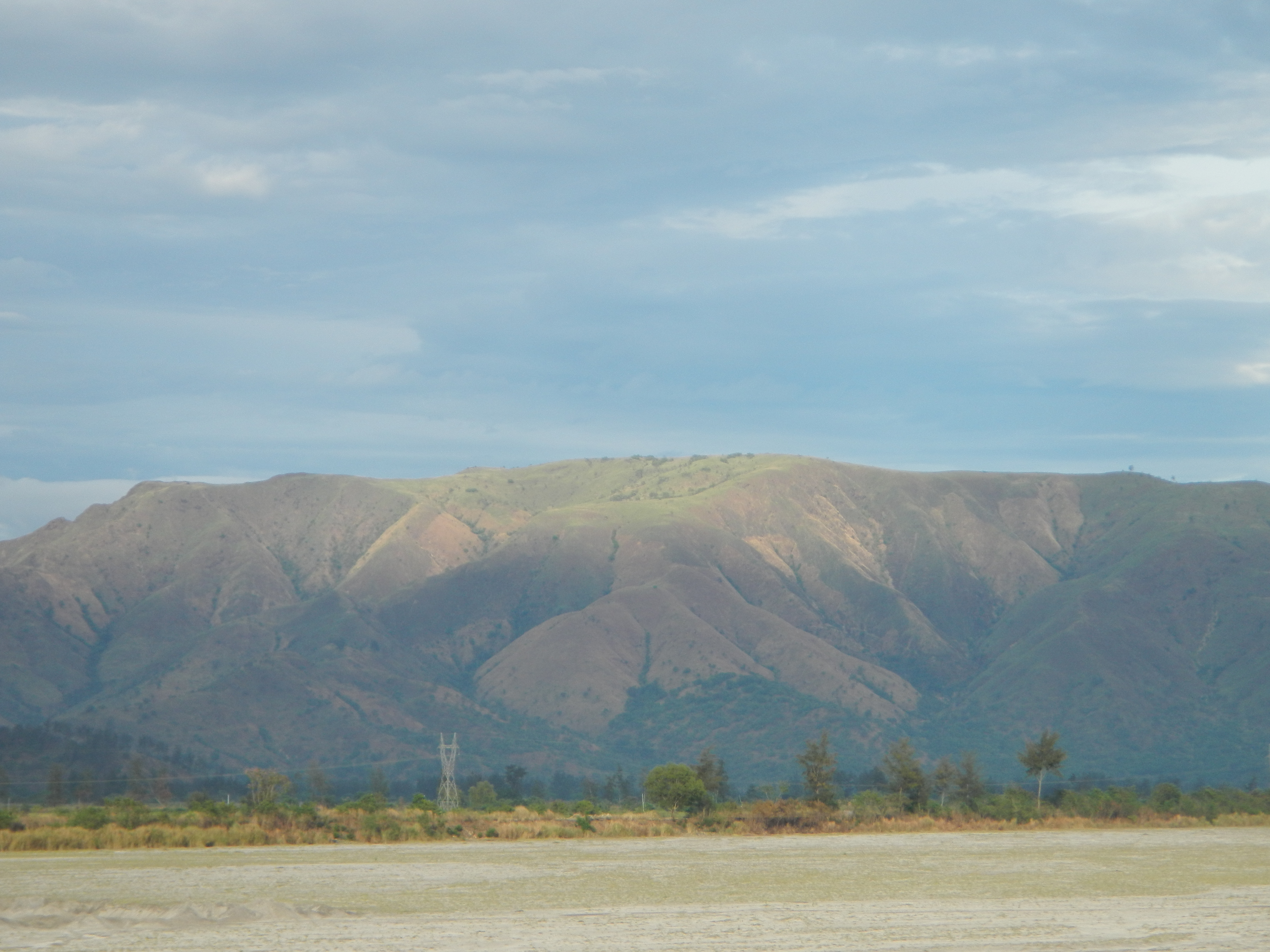
The Zambales Mountains as viewed from San Narciso

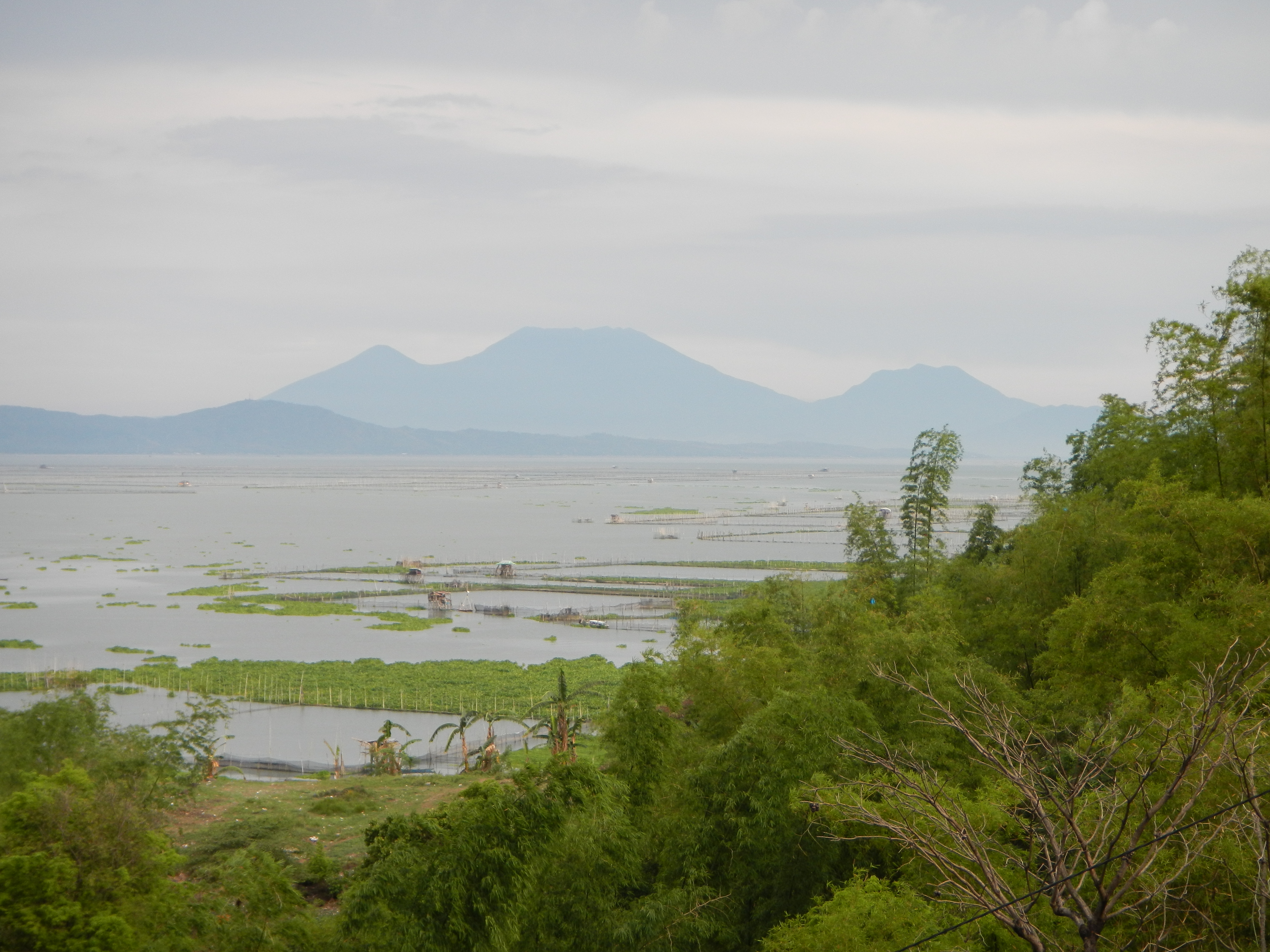
Laguna de Bay at Cardona, with the Banahaw volcano complex in the distance

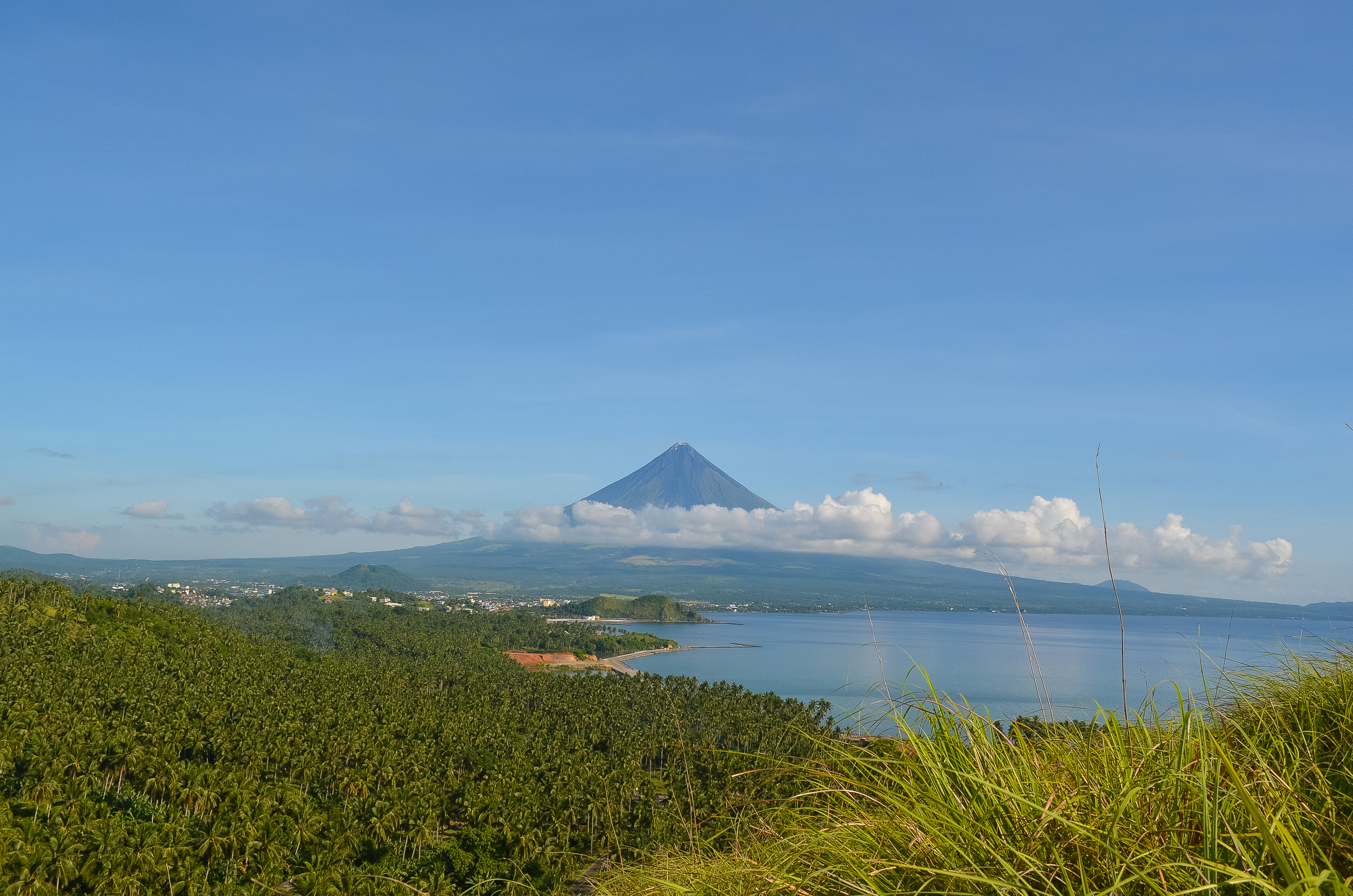
Mayon Volcano overlooking the city of Legazpi.

==== The Batanes and Babuyan islands ====
The Batanes and Babuyan Islands are situated on the northernmost extremity of the Philippines at Luzon Strait facing Taiwan. It contains the northernmost point of land, the islet of Y'Ami in the Batanes Islands, separated from Taiwan by the Bashi Channel (c.80.4672 kilometers (50.0000 mi) wide).

==== Western Luzon ====
This region stretches from Mairaira Point in Pagudpud, Ilocos Norte in the north to Cochinos Point in Mariveles, Bataan in the south. The terrain ranges from coastal plains to rugged mountains bordered by the South China Sea in the west and the Cordillera Central and Zambales mountain ranges in the east. Western Luzon is known for its beaches, surf spots and historic towns.

==== Cagayan Valley ====
Nestled between the Cordilleras in the west and the Sierra Madre mountain ranges in the east is the Cagayan Valley, also the name of the administrative region which it covers. Through its center runs the country's longest river, the Cagayan, flowing in a northward direction before emptying its waters in the Luzon Strait at the town of Aparri.

==== Cordilleras and Caraballos ====
The Cordilleras and Caraballos, together with the Sierra Madre Range, form the main mountain system in Northern Luzon.

The Cordilleras consists of two, sometimes three, mountain ranges that are found in northwestern central Luzon. The first, called Caraballo del Sur, forms the nucleus of the system and has its highest peaks in the border between the provinces of Abra, Ilocos Norte and Cagayan. Caraballo Occidentalles, is further divided into two ranges, the Cordillera Norte and Cordillera Central. They line the central portions of the Cordillera Administrative Region.

The Caraballos (Caraballo de Baler) start where the Sierra Madre and the Cordilleras meet. They are found south of Cagayan Valley, northeast of the Central Luzon Plains.

==== Sierra Madre Mountains ====
Lying in the eastern portion of Luzon is the longest mountain range in the Philippines, the Sierra Madre, stretching from Quezon province in the south to Cagayan in the north. 80 percent of the mountain range is tropical rainforest, which is diminishing from rampant illegal logging activity. The range serves as the eastern wall of Luzon Island that protects inhabitants from tropical cyclones usually coming from the Pacific Ocean.

==== Central Luzon Plains ====
The largest plain of the nation is situated in the Central Luzon region and produces most of the national rice supply, earning itself the nickname "Rice Bowl of the Philippines". The plains encompass the provinces of Bulacan, Nueva Ecija, Pampanga, Tarlac and Pangasinan.

==== Manila-Katagalugan plains ====
South of the Central Luzon plains lies the largest inland freshwater lake in Southeast Asia, Laguna de Bay. To the east of the lake is a plain that stretches westward to Manila Bay. Large rivers from bays and mountain springs traverse the plain. In the northern part of the region, that is, Manila and Rizal, most of the plain had been converted into cities and towns, and are thus industrialized. Lying east of the lake is the southern terminus of the Sierra Madre mountain range at northern Quezon province.

To the southwest of Laguna de Bay is the nation's third largest lake, the Taal, bordered to the north by the Tagaytay Ridge, a ridge stretching from southern Cavite to northern Batangas provinces.

==== Bondoc Peninsula ====
The Bondoc Peninsula is located in the southeastern part of Quezon Province.

==== Bicol Peninsula ====
Southeast of Laguna de Bay lies the Bicol Peninsula, connected to mainland Luzon by the isthmus of Tayabas. The predominantly flat landscape features several solitary peaks, usually active volcanoes, which include Iriga, Mayon and Bulusan.

The peninsula has an irregular coastline that features large bays and gulfs, which include Lamon Bay, San Miguel Bay, Lagonoy Gulf, and Albay Gulf to the north, and the Tayabas Bay, Ragay Gulf and Sorsogon Bay to the south.

=== Mindoro Island ===
==== Mindoro coastal plains ====
Mindoro's coastal plains are characterized by rice and corn fields, rivers, beaches, and extensive open space areas. Most of the population is concentrated on the northern and eastern coast of this island where the city of Calapan and Puerto Galera are located.

==== Mindoro highlands ====
The Mindoro mountain range begins with Mount Halcon and is further divided into three. The northwest ends at Calavite Point and is a landmark for ships. The east originates from Lake Naujan and the west follows the Mindoro Strait.

=== Palawan ===
==== Kalayaan islands (Spratly Islands) ====
The Kalayaan Islands are located to the west of Palawan. Kalayaan is a Filipino word meaning "freedom".

=== Visayas ===
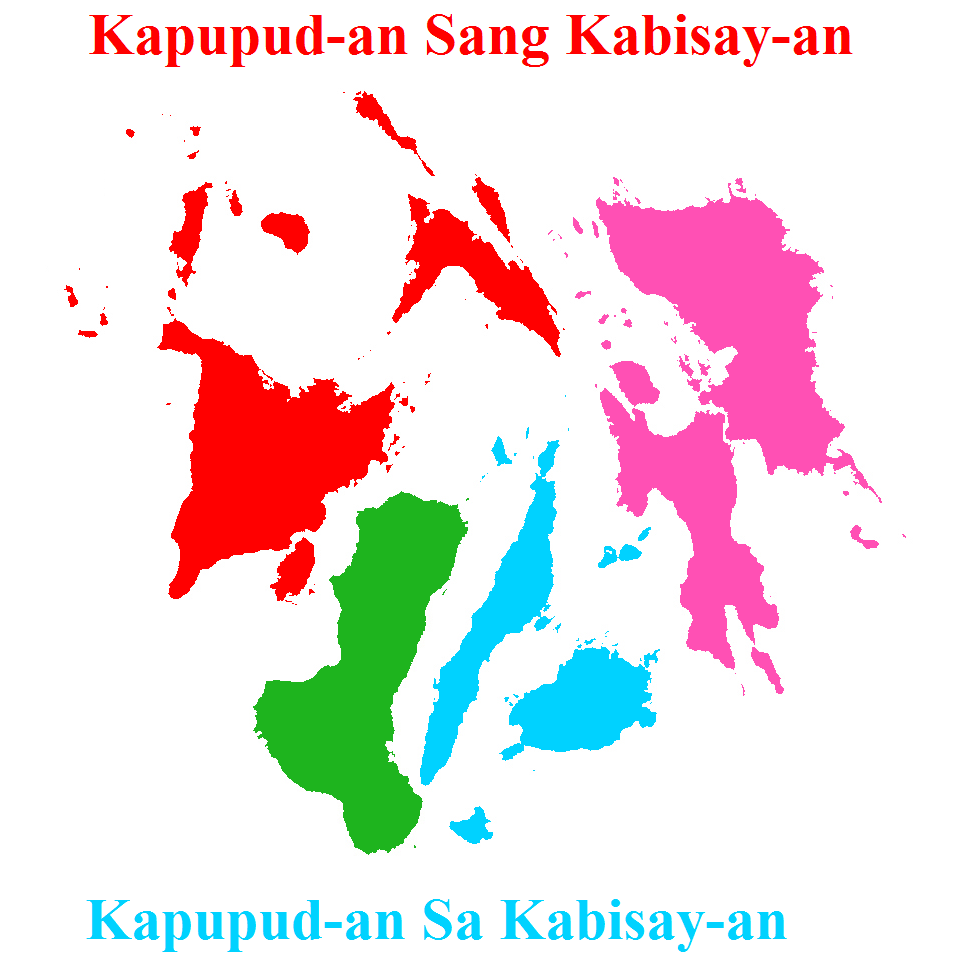
Visayan group of islands: Western Visayas (red), Negros Island (green), Central Visayas (light blue), and Eastern Visayas (pink).

==== Panay-Negros-Cebu Area ====
Panay is the third largest island in the Philippines, behind Mindanao and Luzon. Negros is home to the Canlaon Volcano, one of the active volcanoes in the Philippines. Cebu is a long and narrow island and is the 126th largest island in the world. Other islands nearby include: Guimaras to the south, Negros to the southeast, Bantayan Island and the Romblon island group to the north and Boracay nearby to the northeast.

=== Mindanao ===
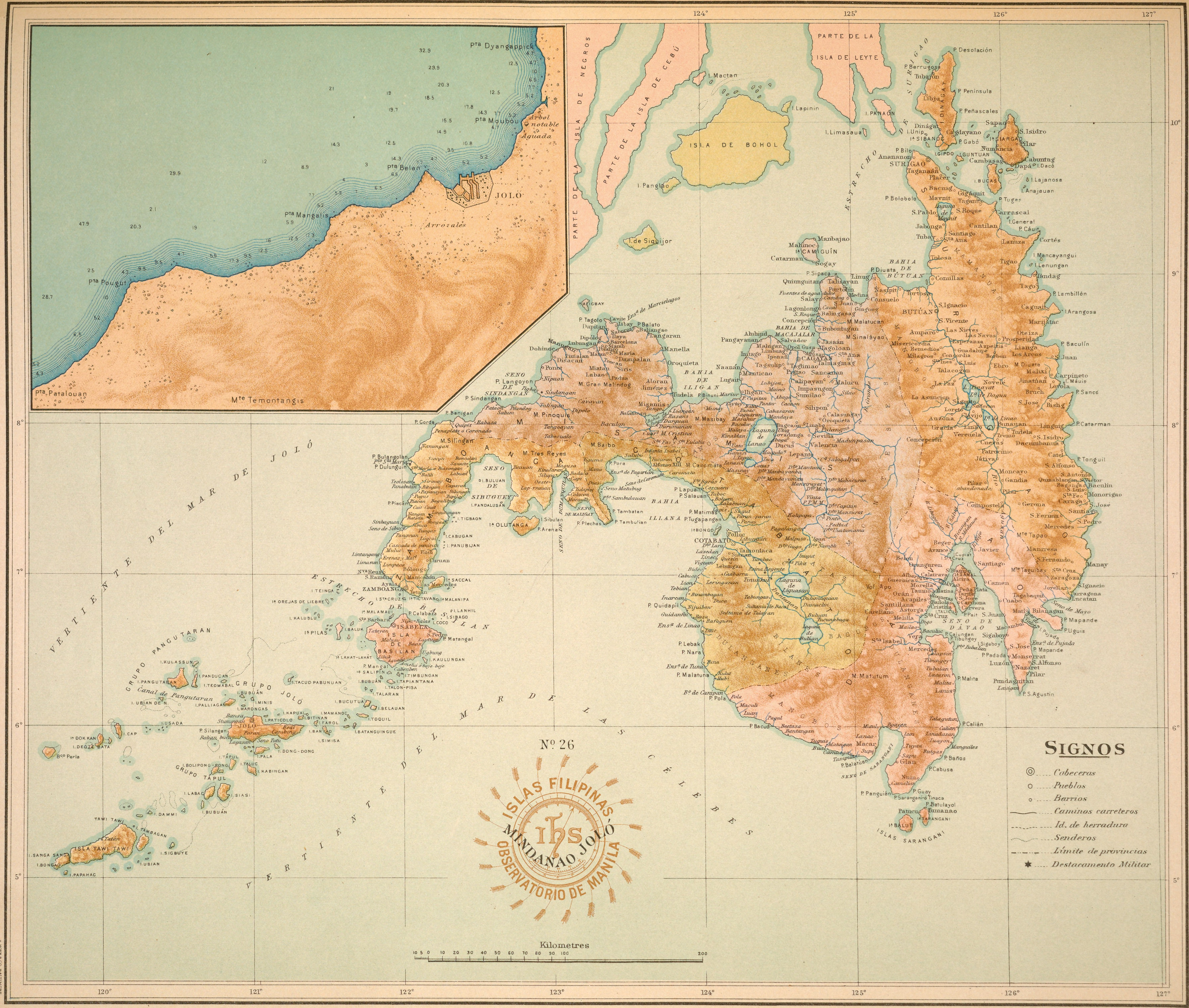
An old map of Mindanao from the Atlas of the Philippine Islands (1900).

==== Eastern Pacific Cordillera ====
The eastern coast of Mindanao features a long mountain range, the Eastern Pacific Cordillera, which stretches from Bilar Point at Surigao in the north to Cape San Agustin at Davao in the south. Forming its northern portion are the Diwata Mountains (also spelled Diuata), separated from the south by low passes situated at the middle. To the east of the range are narrow strips of lowland that feature several inlets and bays, the most prominent of which include the Lianga and Bislig bays.

==== Davao-Agusan Trough ====
To the west of the Pacific Cordillera lies an extensive lowland, the Davao-Agusan Trough. Its northern portion includes the Agusan Valley which forms the lower river basin of the Agusan River. The river flows in a northward direction and empties into Butuan Bay. Draining the southern portion of the lowland are several other rivers, which include the Tagum, flowing southward to Davao Gulf.

==== Central Mindanao highlands ====
Situated west of the Davao-Agusan Trough is a complex series of mountain ranges called the Central Mindanao Highlands (also known as the Central Cordillera). From these mountains form the headwaters of several rivers which include the Rio Grande de Mindanao, Pulangi, Maridagao and Tagoloan rivers. Several tall mountains, such as Mount Apo, the country's highest are found within the range.

==== Bukidnon-Lanao plateaus ====
The north-central portion of Mindanao is dominated by an extensive highland region, the Bukidnon-Lanao Plateau, which includes the Kitanglad and Kalatungan mountain ranges. Within the plateau lies the country's second largest lake, Lake Lanao situated at an elevation of 2,296 feet, drained by the Agus River flowing northward to its river mouth at Iligan Bay.

==== Cotabato Basin ====
South of the Bukidnon-Lanao Plateau lies a large depression, the Cotabato Basin, which forms the lower river basin of the country's second largest river system, the Rio Grande de Mindanao (also known as the Mindanao River). Surrounded by three mountain ranges, the basin's only opening to the sea is to the northwest at Illana Bay, where the Mindanao River empties into the ocean.

To the southeast of the main basin are two large valleys, the Koronadal and Allah valleys.

==== Tiruray highlands ====
Situated south and west of the Cotabato Basin are a moderately high mountain range, the Tiruray Highlands, which block off the Basin from the southern coastline. South of the highlands are narrow strips of coastlines.

==== Zamboanga peninsula ====
At the northwestern tip of Mindanao is the generally mountainous Zamboanga Peninsula. The chain of mountain ranges in this region is called Zamboanga Cordilleras, with the highest elevation at Mount Dapi, which is 2,617 meters (8,586 ft) high.

The southern coastline is irregular, featuring two smaller peninsulas, the Sibuguey and Baganian, extending southward to the Moro Gulf.

=== Outlying islands of Mindanao ===
==== Dinagat and Siargao Islands ====
To the north of the Diwata Mountains at northeast Mindanao lie Siargao island and the Dinagat group of islands.

==== Sulu Archipelago ====
Southwest of the Zamboanga Peninsula is the Sulu Archipelago, a chain of islands which comprise the smaller archipelago provinces of Basilan, Sulu, and Tawi-Tawi.

== Administrative geography ==
The Philippines is divided into a hierarchy of local government units (LGUs) with the 81 provinces and 38 independent cities as the primary unit. Provinces are further subdivided into component cities and municipalities, both of which consist of barangays, the smallest local government unit.

=== Regions ===
There are 18 regions comprising the Philippines. Each region, with the exception of the National Capital Region, is further subdivided into component provinces. The National Capital Region is divided into four special districts.

Most government offices establish regional offices in a city to serve the constituent provinces. Such cities are designated as "regional centers". The regions themselves do not possess a separate local government, with the exception of the Bangsamoro Autonomous Region.

=== Provinces ===
Forming the regions, with the exception of the National Capital, are the 82 provinces. Each province has a capital city or municipality.

==== Landlocked and island provinces ====
Of the 82 provinces of the Philippines, 16 are landlocked, and 16 are island provinces.

Landlocked provinces
Province	Region	Island
Apayao	CAR	Luzon
Abra	CAR	Luzon
Kalinga	CAR	Luzon
Mountain Province	CAR	Luzon
Ifugao	CAR	Luzon
Benguet	CAR	Luzon
Nueva Vizcaya	II	Luzon
Quirino	II	Luzon
Nueva Ecija	III	Luzon
Tarlac	III	Luzon
Laguna (Note: These provinces have coastlines on Laguna de Bay, a large lake. Since lakes do not allow access to seaborne trade, they are considered to be landlocked.)	IV-A	Luzon
Rizal	IV-A	Luzon
Bukidnon	X	Mindanao
Cotabato	XII	Mindanao
Agusan del Sur	XIII	Mindanao
Maguindanao del Sur	Bangsamoro	Mindanao
Notes

Island provinces
Province	Region	Island group
Batanes	II	Luzon
Marinduque	Mimaropa	Luzon
Romblon	Mimaropa	Luzon
Palawan	Mimaropa	Luzon
Catanduanes	V	Luzon
Masbate	V	Luzon
Guimaras	VI	Visayas
Cebu	VII	Visayas
Bohol	VII	Visayas
Siquijor	VII	Visayas
Biliran	VIII	Visayas
Camiguin	X	Mindanao
Dinagat Islands	XIII	Mindanao
Basilan	BARMM	Mindanao
Sulu	BARMM	Mindanao
Tawi-Tawi	BARMM	Mindanao

== Climate ==
Philippines map of Köppen climate classification zones

The Philippines has a tropical maritime climate that is usually hot and humid. There are three seasons: tag-init or tag-araw, the hot dry season or summer from March to May; tag-ulan, the rainy season from June to November; and tag-lamig, the cool dry season from December to February. The southwest monsoon (from May to October) is known as the Habagat, and the dry winds of the northeast monsoon (from November to April), the Amihan. Temperatures usually range from 21 °C (70 °F) to 32 °C (90 °F) although it can get cooler or hotter depending on the season. The coolest month is January; the warmest is May. Some locations have no dry season (meaning, all months have an average rainfall of above 60 mm (2.4 in)) and certain higher-altitude areas can have a subtropical climate. Manila and most of the lowland areas are hot and dusty from March to May. Even at this time, however, temperatures rarely rise above 37 °C (98.6 °F). Mean annual sea-level temperatures rarely fall below 27 °C (80.6 °F). Annual rainfall measures as much as 5,000 millimeters (196.9 in) in the mountainous east coast section of the country, but less than 1,000 millimeters (39.4 in) in some of the sheltered valleys.

The average yearly temperature is around 26.6 °C (79.9 °F). In considering temperature, location in terms of latitude and longitude is not a significant factor. Whether in the extreme north, south, east, or west of the country, temperatures at sea level tend to be in the same range. Altitude usually has more of an impact. The average annual temperature of Baguio at an elevation of 1,500 meters (4,900 ft) above sea level is 18.3 °C (64.9 °F), making it a popular destination during hot summers. Annual rainfall measures as much as 5,000 millimeters (200 in) in the mountainous east coast section but less than 1,000 millimeters (39 in) in some of the sheltered valleys. Monsoon rains, although hard and drenching, are not normally associated with high winds and waves. But the Philippines sit astride the typhoon belt, and it suffers an annual onslaught of dangerous storms from July through October. These are especially hazardous for northern and eastern Luzon and the Bicol and Eastern Visayas regions, but Manila gets devastated periodically as well.

In the last decade, the Philippines has been hit severely by natural disasters. In 2005 alone, Central Luzon was hit by both a drought, which sharply curtailed hydroelectric power, and by a typhoon that flooded practically all of low-lying Manila's streets. Still more damaging was the 1990 earthquake that devastated a wide area in Luzon, including Baguio and other northern areas. The city of Cebu and nearby areas were struck by a typhoon that killed more than a hundred people, sank vessels, destroyed part of the sugar crop, and cut off water and electricity for several days. The Philippines is prone to about six to nine storms which make landfall each year, on average. The 1991 Mount Pinatubo eruption also damaged much of Central Luzon, the lahar burying towns and farmland, and the ashes affecting global temperatures.

Sitting astride the typhoon belt, the islands experience 15-20 typhoons annually from July to October, with around nineteen typhoons entering the Philippine area of responsibility in a typical year and eight or nine making landfall. Historically typhoons were sometimes referred to as baguios. The wettest recorded typhoon to hit the Philippines dropped 2,210 millimeters (87 in) in Baguio from July 14 to 18, 1911. The Philippines is highly exposed to climate change and is among the world's ten countries that are most vulnerable to climate change risks.

Building construction is undertaken with natural disasters in mind. Most rural housing has consisted of nipa huts that are easily damaged but are inexpensive and easy to replace. Most urban buildings are steel and concrete structures designed (not always successfully) to resist both typhoons and earthquakes. Damage is still significant, however, and many people are displaced each year by typhoons, earthquakes, and other natural disasters. In 1987 alone the Department of Social Welfare and Development helped 2.4 million victims of natural disasters.

== Statistics ==
=== CIA Statistics ===
Unless otherwise indicated, the information below is taken from CIA Factbook information for the Philippines.

==== Area ====
- Total: 300,000 square kilometres (115,831 sq mi)
  - country rank in the world: 72nd
- Land: 298,170 square kilometres (115,124 sq mi)
- Water: 1,830 square kilometres (707 sq mi)

Area – comparative
- Australia comparative: approximately 1 1/3 times the size of Victoria
- Canada comparative: approximately 5/8 the size of the Yukon
- United States comparative: slightly larger than Arizona
- United Kingdom comparative: approximately 1 1/4 times the size of the United Kingdom
- EU comparative: slightly smaller than Italy

==== Coastline ====
- 36,289 kilometres (22,549 mi)

==== Maritime claims ====
(measured from claimed archipelagic baselines)

- Continental shelf: to depth of exploitation
- Exclusive economic zone: 2,263,816 km^{2} (874,064 mi^{2}) with 200 nautical miles (370 km)
- Territorial sea: irregular polygon extending up to 100 nautical miles (190 km; 120 mi) from the coastline as defined by 1898 treaty; since the late 1970s has also claimed the polygonal-shaped area in the South China Sea up to 285 nautical miles (528 km; 328 mi) in breadth.
Oceans and Seas in the Philippines

==== Natural resources ====
- Timber, petroleum, nickel, cobalt, silver, gold, salt, and copper.

==== Land use ====
- Arable land: 20%
- Permanent crops: 16.67%
- Other: 64.33% (2005)

==== Irrigated land ====
- 15,500 square kilometers (5,985 sq mi) (2003)

==== Natural hazards ====
The Philippines sit astride typhoon belt and are usually affected by 15 and struck by five to six cyclonic storms per year; landslides; active volcanoes; destructive earthquakes; tsunamis.

==== Environment - current issues ====
- Uncontrolled deforestation in watershed areas; soil erosion; air and water pollution in Manila; increasing pollution of coastal mangrove swamps which are important fish breeding grounds; severe water pollution that caused the death of one of the country's major rivers, though there are ongoing efforts at resuscitation.

Typhoon Haiyan in November 2013 caused major problems.

==== Environment - international agreements ====
- Party to: Biodiversity, Climate Change, Endangered Species, Hazardous Wastes, Law of the Sea, Marine Dumping, Nuclear Test Ban, Ozone Layer Protection, Tropical Timber 83, Tropical Timber 94, Wetlands, Whaling
- Signed, but not ratified: Climate Change-Kyoto Protocol, Desertification.

=== Subnational enclaves and exclaves ===
In political geography, an enclave is a territory or part of a territory lying wholly within the boundaries of another, and an exclave is one which is politically attached to a larger piece but not actually contiguous with it. Many entities are both enclaves and exclaves, but the two are not synonymous.

==== Exclaves and enclaves ====
- Caloocan is divided in two by Valenzuela City and Quezon City.
- In Cotabato province, the municipality of President Roxas is divided in two by Antipas municipality.
- Manila South Cemetery is an exclave of the district of San Andres, located in the capital city of Manila. It is divided and surrounded by Makati.

==== Pene-enclaves/exclaves and inaccessible districts ====
- In Soccsksargen:
  - Sarangani province is separated into two sections by General Santos and Sarangani Bay.
- In the Zamboanga Peninsula:
  - Isabela City, the provincial capital of Basilan province (part of the Bangsamoro Autonomous Region) is part of Zamboanga Peninsula despite it being separated from it by the Basilan Strait.
  - Zamboanga City, a highly urbanized independent city, is statistically part of Zamboanga del Sur province, but is separated from it by Zamboanga Sibugay province.

=== Subnational quadripoint ===
A quadripoint is a point on the Earth that touches four distinct regions. Such points are often called "four corners", from the corners of the four regions meeting there.

- Four provinces in Mindanao meet at a point at the summit of Mount Apo: Bukidnon of Northern Mindanao Region, Davao del Norte and Davao del Sur of Davao Region, and Cotabato Province of Soccsksargen

==== More than four ====
Four distinct geographic divisions converging at a single point is not uncommon in the Philippines, and there are other points of convergence between five or more divisions that can be found.

Count	Cities/municipalities	Location
5	Tagkawayan; Labo; San Lorenzo Ruiz; San Vicente; Del Gallego	Camarines Norte, Camarines Sur, Quezon
5	Cadiz; Sagay; Silay; Talisay; Calatrava	Negros Occidental
5	Batuan; Bilar; Carmen; Dimiao; Valencia	Bohol
5	Alicia; Dagohoy; Pilar; San Miguel; Ubay	Bohol
5	Baungon; Lantapan; Sumilao; Talakag; Malaybalay	Bukidnon
5	Aleosan; Carmen; Kabacan; Pikit; Pagagawan	Cotabato, Maguindanao
5	Tibiao; Barbaza; Madalag; Libacao; Jamindan	Antique, Aklan, Capiz
6	Basey; Marabut; Balangkayan; Llorente; Balangiga; Lawaan	Eastern Samar, Samar
8	Ligao; Legazpi; Tabaco; Guinobatan; Camalig; Daraga; Malilipot; Santo Domingo	Albay (Mayon Volcano crater)

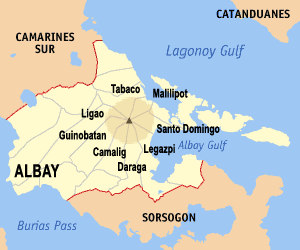
Mayon shared by 8 cities/towns

=== Geographic center ===
The island province of Marinduque prides itself as being the geographic center of the Philippines. The Marinduque governor has stated that their claim to be the Geographical Center of the Philippines has received notice and support from the National Mapping and Resource Information Authority (NAMRIA). The Luzon Datum of 1911 in Marinduque is used as point number one for all map makers in the country.

The boundaries of the Philippine archipelago are described in Article III of the Treaty of Paris (1898), as comprising an irregular polygon. A box enclosing that polygon would have corners at 20°N 116°E, 20°N 127°E, 4.75°N 127°E, 4.75°N 116°E. The center of this box would lie at 121.5 E, 12.375 N. That point lies roughly in the center of the Tablas Strait between the islands of Tablas and Mindoro.

Republic Act No. 9522, "An Act to Define the Baselines of the Territorial Sea of the Philippines", describes an irregular polygon which fits within a box with its center at 121°44'47.45"E 12°46'6.1252"N, a point also roughly in the center of the Tablas Strait.

The CIA Factbook locates the Philippines at 13°N 122°E.

The extreme points under Philippine control as of 2010 are:

Direction	Location	Coordinates	
Direction	Location	Latitude (N)	Longitude (E)
North	Amianan Island, Batanes	21º7’18.41"	121º56’48.79"
East	Pusan Point, Davao Oriental^{[a]}	7º17’19.80"	126º36’18.26"
South	Frances Reef, Tawi-Tawi	4º24’53.84"	119º14’50.71"
West	Thitu Island^{[b]}, Kalayaan, Palawan	11°3’10.19"	114°16’54.66"
^{a} Pusan Point is the easternmost incorporated territory of the Philippines, but the Benham Plateau is the easternmost unincorporated territory of the Philippines.; ^{b} Thitu island is the westernmost of all the Spratly Island features controlled by the Philippines as of December 2009.

The center of a box enclosing these points would be located at 12°46’6.13"N, 120°26’36.46"E. That point is located in the Mindoro Strait, about 12 kilometres (7.5 mi) NNE of Apo Island, in Sablayan, Occidental Mindoro.

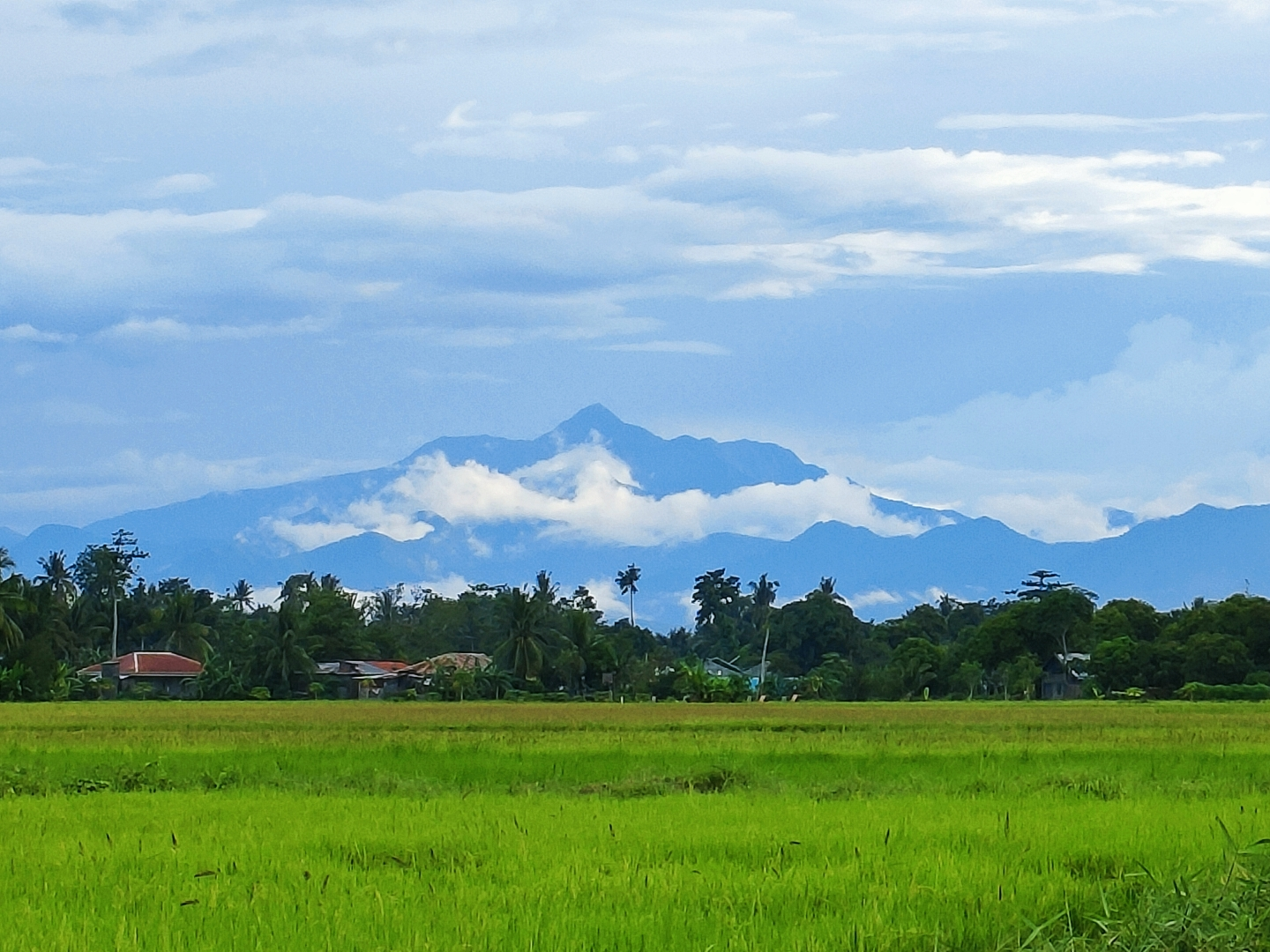
Mount Madja-as in Antique

== See also ==
- Island groups of the Philippines
  - List of islands of the Philippines
- List of headlands of the Philippines
- List of mountains in the Philippines
  - List of Ultras of the Philippines
- List of volcanoes in the Philippines
  - List of active volcanoes in the Philippines
  - List of potentially active volcanoes in the Philippines
  - List of inactive volcanoes in the Philippines
- List of bays of the Philippines
- List of lakes of the Philippines
- List of rivers of the Philippines
- Extreme points of the Philippines
- Territories claimed by the Philippines
- Borders of the Philippines
- Subduction tectonics of the Philippines
