= Borders of the Philippines =

Political boundaries between the Philippines and neighboring territories

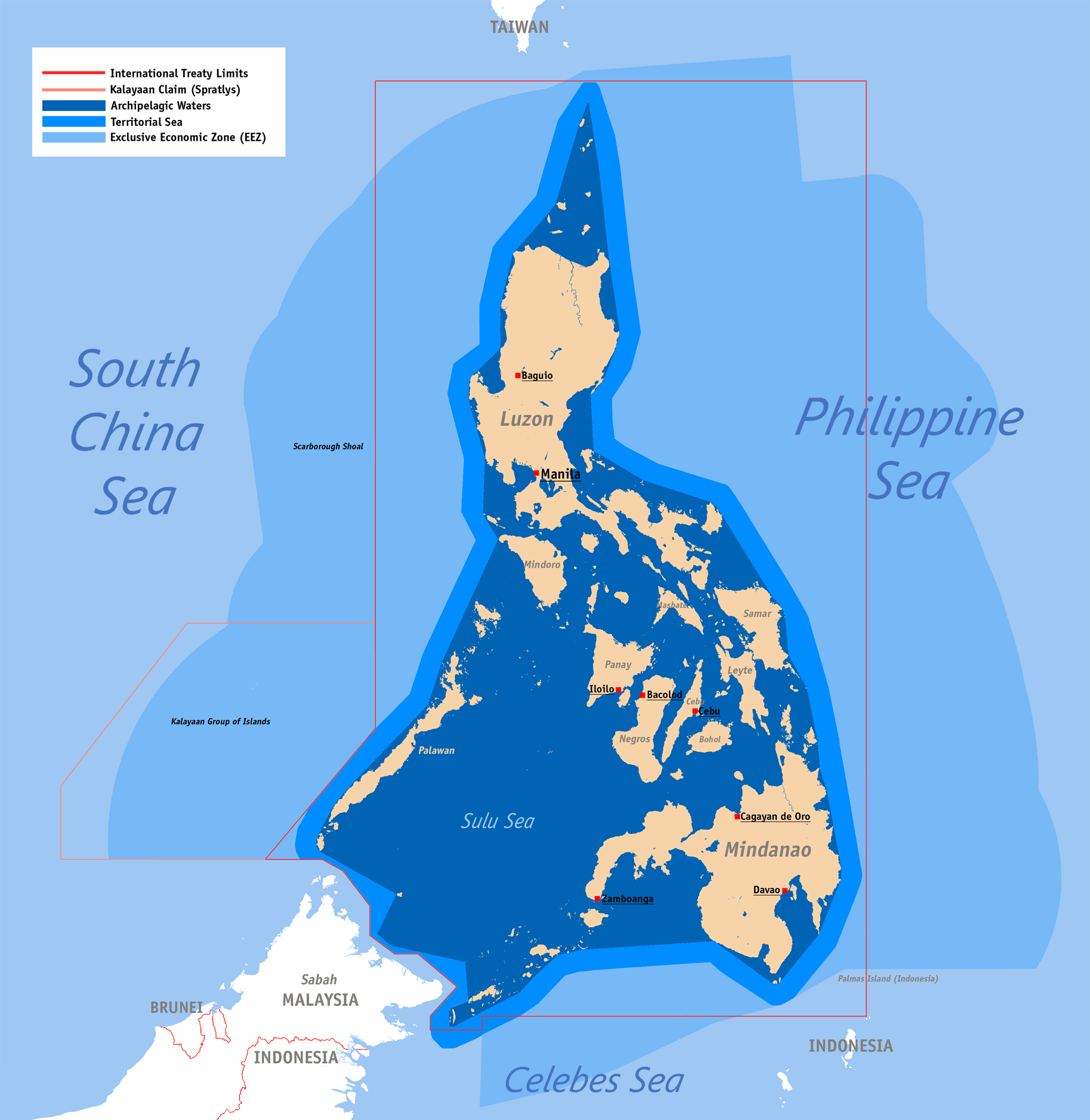
Map of the Philippines including territorial and exclusive economic zone (EEZ) claims

As an archipelago, the Philippines shares no land borders with any country, although the country claims a land border with Malaysia as a consequence of its territorial claims over the eastern portion of the Malaysian state of Sabah.

The maritime borders of the country are complicated by the South China Sea dispute and lack of delimitation agreements with Palau.

== Maritime borders ==
The following are countries shares maritime borders with the Philippines.

Country	Notes
China	The Philippines shares a maritime border with China in the South China Sea although the extent of the border is disputed by the two countries. The Philippine claim covers an area of the South China Sea island which its government has designated as "West Philippine Sea" which includes the likewise internationally contested Spratly Islands and Scarborough Shoal. China claims virtually all of the South China Sea via its nine dash line claim of China straddles near the western coastline of the Philippines.
Japan	
Indonesia	Main article: Indonesia–Philippines border The boundary of Philippines (Mindanao) and Indonesia (North Sulawesi) is the Philippines-Indonesia Exclusive Economic Zone (EEZ) Delimitation which is a delimitation line along the Celebes Sea that separates both countries which was agreed upon between the Government of the Philippines and Indonesia on May 23, 2014. The Philippine portion of the sea before the said border is known as the Mindanao Sea.
Malaysia	Main article: Malaysia–Philippines border The international treaty limits separating the Philippines and Malaysia are situated between the Turtle Islands municipality of Tawi-Tawi in the Philippines and the Malaysian state of Sabah. Portions of Sabah itself are subject to a territorial dispute between the two countries. Malaysia also claims portions of the Spratly Islands
Palau	The exact boundaries of Palau and the Philippines is remained to be defined by delimitation talks. A final agreement has not been made regarding the issue. The two countries share a maritime border with Palau situated southeast of the Philippines.
Taiwan (Republic of China)	North of the Philippines is the Republic of China (ROC) controlled Taiwan island. The Philippines has a dispute with the ROC regarding their EEZs in the Bashi Channel. Republic of China also shares the same claims in the South China Sea by the People's Republic of China.
Vietnam	
