= Sorsogon Bay =

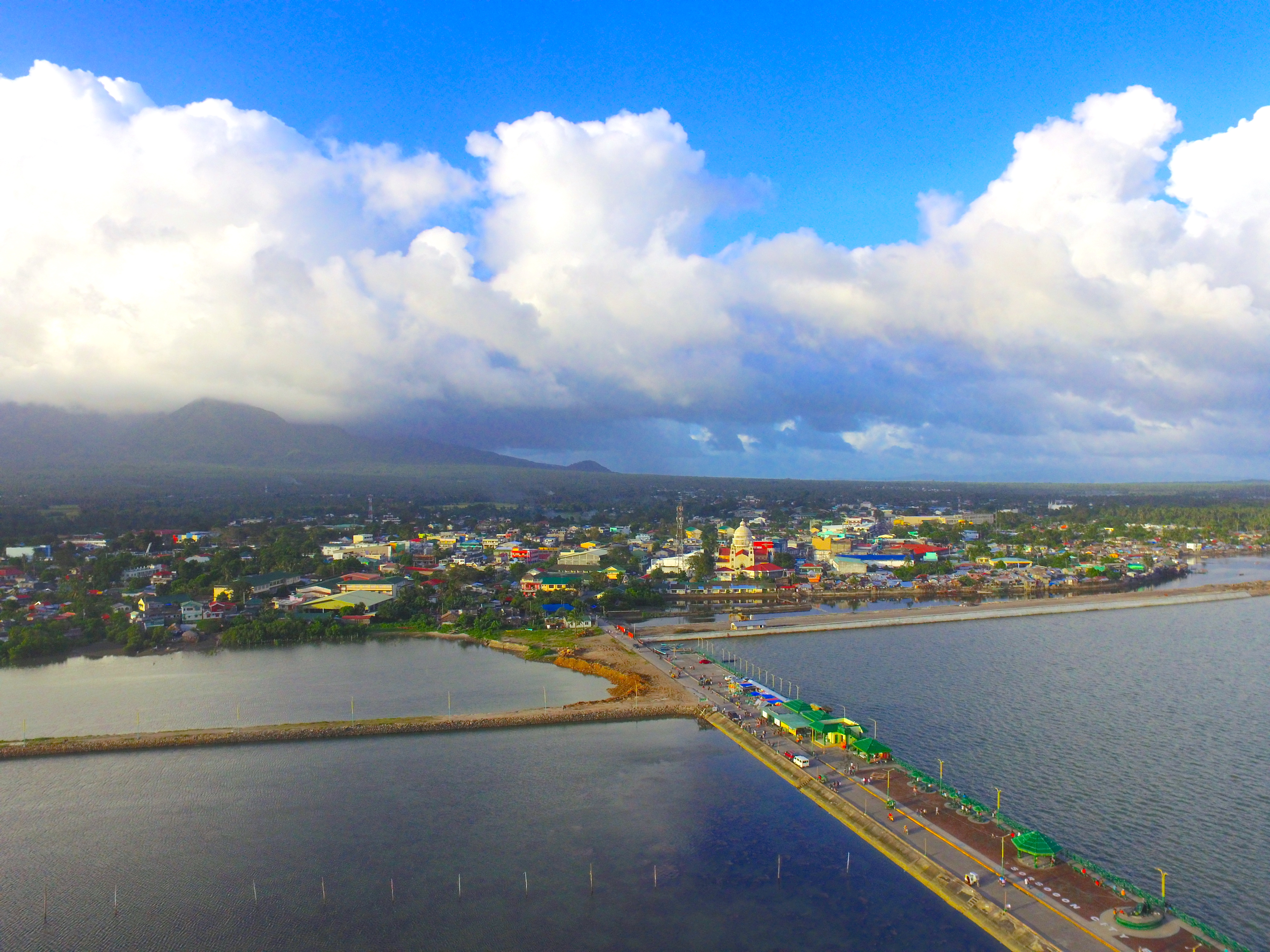
- View of downtown Sorsogon from aerial photo taken at the Rompeolas

- Location in Sorsogon Location in Luzon Location in the Philippines
- Location: Bicol Peninsula, Luzon Island, Philippines
- Coordinates: 12°55′0.12″N 124°00′9″E
- Type: bay
- Settlements: Casiguran; Castilla; Juban; Pilar; Magallanes; Sorsogon City

Sorsogon Bay is a bay in the Bicol Peninsula, located on Luzon island in the Philippines. It is completely surrounded by the province of Sorsogon. The municipalities of Pilar, Juban, Casiguran, Sorsogon City, Castilla and Magallanes are located along its shores.

The bay is approximately 201 square kilometers (78 sq mi) and is connected to the Ticao Pass through a narrow channel. Most of the bay is shallow with depths ranging from half a fathom to five fathoms with even deeper portions at the mouth from 5.5 to 16 fathoms.

== Fishing industry ==
The bay is a source of various shellfish including oysters, crabs, mussels, and pen shells which are known to locals as "baluko". A 1995 study estimated the total production in the bay at 5,585.62 metric tons.

In 1972, the provincial board of Sorsogon declared the bay as a conservation area and banned use of destructive fishing methods.

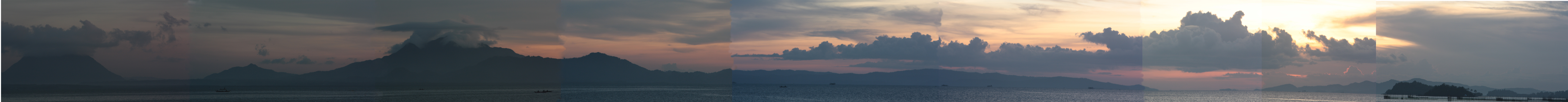
Panoramic view of Sorsogon Bay

== See also ==
- List of bays of the Philippines
