= Abag Bay =

Bay in Mindanao, Philippines

Coordinates: 6°25′N 126°09′E

Abag Bay is a bay in Mindanao, Philippines. Abag is bight, which also contains the village of Kalaguhan.
