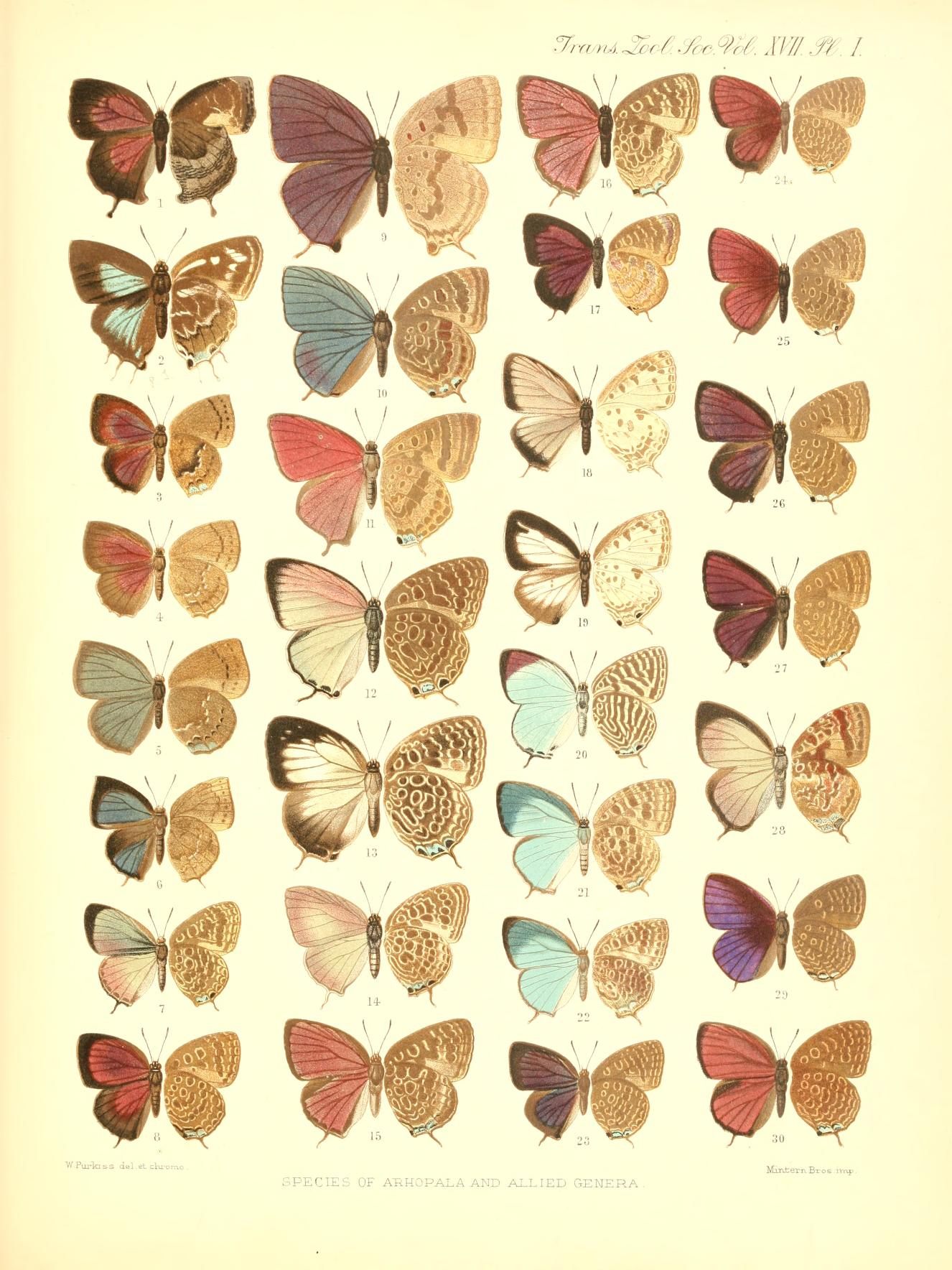
- Arhopala sangira plate accompanying original description

Scientific classification
- Kingdom: Animalia
- Phylum: Arthropoda
- Clade: Pancrustacea
- Class: Insecta
- Order: Lepidoptera
- Family: Lycaenidae
- Genus: Arhopala
- Species: A. sangira

Binomial name
- Arhopala sangira Bethune-Baker, 1897

= Arhopala sangira =

Species of butterfly

Arhopala sangira is a butterfly in the family Lycaenidae. It was described by George Thomas Bethune-Baker in 1897. It is found in the Indomalayan realm where it is endemic to the Sangihe Islands (Celebes).

== Description ==
Has the same under surface as argentea, but the upper surface of the male is more silvery blue, and the bluish-black apical spot of the forewing is obliquely cut off. Island of Sangir.
