= Alan B. Banister =

United States Navy admiral (1905–1963)

Alan Boyd Banister
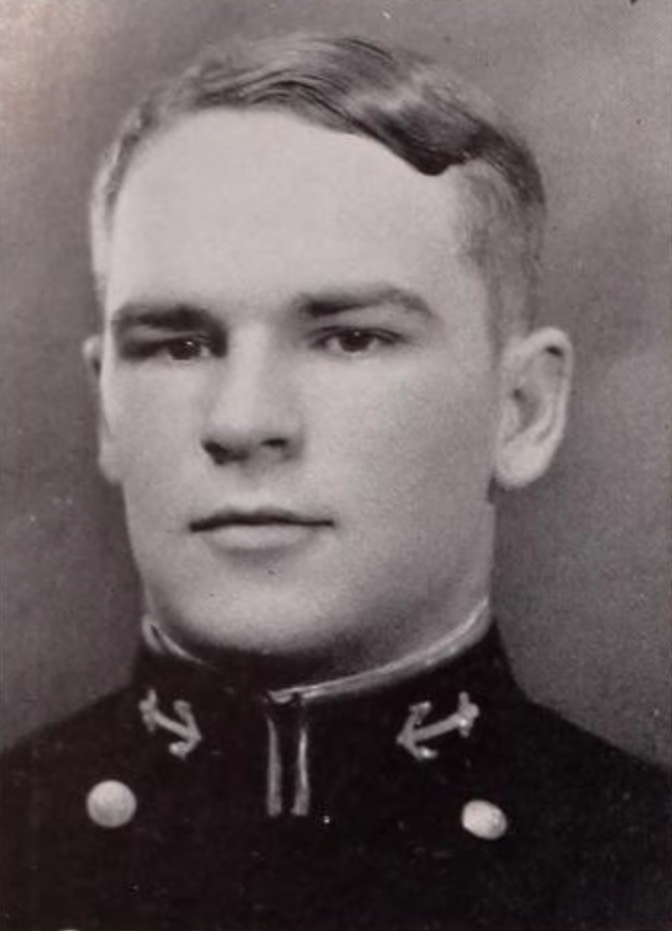
- Born: February 4, 1905; Grant, Oklahoma, US
- Died: November 1, 1963 (aged 58); Portsmouth, New Hampshire, US
- Education: United States Naval Academy
- Spouse: Cynthia Pruden Harts
- Military career
- Allegiance: United States of America
- Branch: United States Navy
- Service years: 1928-1958
- Rank: Rear Admiral
- Commands: USS R-2 (SS-79); USS Sawfish; Submarine Division 361; Submarine Division 31; Submarine Squadron 4 Submarine Flotilla 1 Portsmouth Naval Shipyard
- Conflicts: World War II
- Awards: Navy Cross (2)

Alan Boyd Banister (February 4, 1905 – November 1, 1963) was a decorated submarine commander during World War II who reached the rank of Rear Admiral in the United States Navy.

Although Bannister was born in 1905 in what is now Oklahoma, his family had a long history in Virginia. One of his ancestors was John Banister of Virginia, who was one of the commissioners responsible for the United States Articles of Confederation of 1776.

He graduated from the United States Naval Academy in 1928. After his commissioning he attended the Navy's submarine school. In 1938 he took command of the USS R-2.

In June 1938 he married the former Cynthia Harts in her hometown of Madison, Connecticut. His wife came from a military family, her father and two brothers rising to the rank of Brigadier General. The couple had a son and three daughters.

During World War II Banister commanded the submarine USS Sawfish. By the end of the war he was leading groups of submarines. According to his obituary in The New York Times he earned multiple decorations, including two Navy Crosses.

After the war his commands included Commander, Submarine Squadron Four in Key West and Commander, Submarines, Atlantic Fleet.

== World War II ==
After the Attack on Pearl Harbor resulted in the American entry into World War II, Banister remained at the Submarine School at New London as an instructor in the Submarine Department. He became head of the Electrical Department of the school in September 1942 and Prospective Commanding Officer of the submarines Searaven and Sawfish from July 1943. Banister took command of the Sawfish in December of that year. He commanded the submarine on her seventh war patrol from 22 June to 15 August 1944, during which she patrolled the Luzon Strait together with Rock and Tilefish, forming the Wilkin's Wildcats wolf pack. Alerted by Ultra intercepts to the presence of the Japanese submarine I-29, returning from Germany carrying a cargo of technical materials, the wolf pack set an ambush on 26 July . Banister fired four torpedoes at I-29, which exploded from three hits. He was awarded the Navy Cross for his attack on a Japanese tanker and the sinking of I-29.

On the eighth war patrol of Sawfish from 9 September to 8 November, Banister led a wolf pack that included Sawfish, Icefish, and Drum into Luzon Strait and Formosa Strait. He rescued a navy pilot who had been adrift for four and a half days on 16 October. The wolf pack ran into several Japanese convoys transporting supplies and reinforcements to the Philippines between 23 and 26 October. On the night of 23 October he sank the converted seaplane tender Kimikawa Maru, while Drum and Icefish accounted for three freighters in the next three days. Banister was awarded a second Navy Cross for his leadership of the wolf pack, credited with sinking eight Japanese ships totaling more than 56,000 tons, and the rescue of the aviator.

After Sawfish returned from her eighth war patrol, Banister was assigned to various submarines of Submarine Force, US Atlantic Fleet as a prospective submarine division commander from December 1944. He became commander of Submarine Division 361 with his flag aboard Chivo in May 1945.

== Postwar ==
Banister transferred to command Submarine Division 31 aboard Charr in October 1945, and became executive officer of the Naval Ammunition Depot at Fort Mifflin in April 1946. He began another shore tour in June 1947, serving in a similar position at Submarine Base New London. He returned to sea duty in July 1948 as commander of Submarine Squadron 4 aboard Clamagore. After studying at the National War College between August 1949 and June 1950, Banister was posted to the Weapons Systems Evaluation Group of the Office of the Secretary of Defense. After a stint as Chief of Staff and Aide to the Commander, Submarine Force, US Atlantic Fleet from July 1952, Banister took command of Submarine Flotilla 1 aboard Volador in July 1954. He became Director of the Naval Reserve Plans Division of the Office of the Chief of Naval Operations on 7 December 1955 and was acting Assistant Chief of Naval Operations for the Naval Reserve between July 1956 and June 1957. His final post was as chief of staff and aide to the Commander of Naval Base Portsmouth before retiring on 1 July 1958 with a graveyard promotion to rear admiral. Banister died in Boston on 1 November 1963.
