= Takakazu Kinashi =

Japanese submarine commander (1902–1944)

- 木梨 鷹一
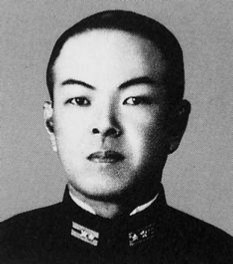
- Born: 7 March 1902; Ōita Prefecture, Japan
- Died: 26 July 1944 (aged 42); Balintang Channel, Philippines
- Military career
- Allegiance: Empire of Japan
- Branch: Imperial Japanese Navy
- Service years: 1920–1944
- Rank: Rear Admiral (posthumous)
- Commands: Ro-59, I-3, Ro-34, I-62, I-162, I-19, I-29
- Conflicts: World War II; Battle of Midway; Guadalcanal campaign
- Awards: Iron Cross, 2nd class

Takakazu Kinashi (木梨 鷹一, Kinashi Takakazu; 7 March 1902 – 26 July 1944) was a Japanese naval officer during World War II. As captain of submarine I-19, he sank the American aircraft carrier USS Wasp and destroyer USS O'Brien and severely damaged the battleship USS North Carolina with a single spread of six torpedoes in 1942. He was the most successful submarine commander of the Imperial Japanese Navy during World War II, sinking five merchant ships, one carrier and one destroyer, for a total of 39,097 GRT, and damaging a further one battleship and four merchant ships, for 69,542 GRT.

== Biography ==
Kinashi was a native of Usuki in Ōita Prefecture. His name is sometimes transliterated as "Takaichi Kinatsu". His early career was not promising, as he graduated in very last place as 255th of 255 cadets in the 51st class of the Imperial Japanese Navy Academy in 1920. He served his midshipman duty on the armored cruiser Iwate and light cruiser Tatsuta, and on the armored cruiser Izumo on her long-distance navigational training voyage to Hilo, Hawaii; Acapulco, Mexico; Balboa, Panama; San Francisco, California; Vancouver, British Columbia, Canada; Honolulu, Hawaii; Jaluit Atoll, Truk Atoll, Saipan, and the Ogasawara Islands in 1924–1925. He was promoted to ensign during Izumo′s voyage, and on his return to Japan, he completed naval artillery and torpedo warfare training. He was assigned to the destroyer Harukaze and promoted to sub-lieutenant in December 1926.

In 1927, Kinashi transferred to the Japanese submarine force. He was promoted to lieutenant in November 1929 and through the mid-1930s served in various capacities on the submarines I-61, I-54, and I-66, the river gunboat Ataka, and the destroyer Fubuki. He was promoted to lieutenant commander in December 1937, and assigned to the minelayer Okinoshima.

Kinashi held his first command, of the submarine Ro-59, from 1938 to 1940. In 1940, he was reassigned to the Submarine Warfare School, but returned to sea six months later as captain of the submarine I-3 from July to November 1940, and of Ro-34 from November 1940 to July 1941.

At the time of the attack on Pearl Harbor in December 1941, Kinashi was captain of the submarine I-62, which was renumbered I-162 on 20 May 1942. Shortly after commanding I-162 during the Battle of Midway in June 1942, he took command of the submarine I-19.

On 15 September 1942, while patrolling south of the Solomon Islands during the Guadalcanal campaign, I-19 sighted and attacked the American aircraft carrier USS Wasp, which was part of a task force transporting the 7th Marine Regiment and stores to Guadalcanal. Kinashi penetrated the destroyer screen, and after closing to within 500 meters (550 yd) of the aircraft carrier, launched his full salvo of six torpedoes. Three torpedoes struck Wasp, starting uncontrollable fires which soon forced the abandonment of the ship, which was later scuttled by USS Lansdowne. The remaining three torpedoes continued beyond the horizon for another 12 nautical miles (22 km; 14 mi) into a separate task force centered around the aircraft carrier USS Hornet, striking the battleship USS North Carolina and destroyer O'Brien. O'Brien sank several weeks later and North Carolina was so severely damaged that she was out of action for several months for repairs. Kinashi was promoted to commander less than two months later, and honored with a personal interview with Emperor Hirohito.

On 2 May 1943, while near Suva, Fiji, I-19 under the command of Kinashi torpedoed the Liberty ship SS William Williams. However, for unknown reasons, Kinashi chose not to finish off the heavily damaged ship, which was later towed to New Zealand and repaired, becoming the U.S. Navy cargo ship USS Venus.

From October 1943, Kinashi was captain of the submarine I-29. On 17 December 1943, I-29 was dispatched on a secret Yanagi mission under the Axis powers' Tripartite Pact to provide for an exchange of personnel, strategic materials, and manufactured goods between Nazi Germany and the Empire of Japan. At Singapore, she was loaded with 80 tons of raw rubber, 80 tons of tungsten, 50 tons of tin, two tons of zinc, and three tons of quinine, opium, and coffee. In spite of Allied Ultra signals intelligence decryptions revealing her mission, I-29 managed to reach Lorient in German-occupied France on 11 March 1944. While his crew rested in France, Kinashi travelled to Berlin, where he was awarded the Iron Cross 2nd class personally by Adolf Hitler for his role in sinking Wasp.

I-29 left Lorient on 16 April 1944 with 18 passengers and a cargo torpedo boat engines, Enigma coding machines, radar components, a Walter HWK 509A rocket engine, and Messerschmitt Me 163 and Messerschmitt Me 262 blueprints to support the development of the Mitsubishi J8M rocket plane, arriving at Singapore on 14 July 1944.

During I-29′s subsequent voyage from Singapore to Kure, Japan, U.S. Navy Commander W. D. Wilkins's "Wildcats" submarine task force — consisting of USS Tilefish, USS Rock, and USS Sawfish — intercepted her using Ultra signals intelligence. During the evening of 26 July 1944, Sawfish hit I-29 with three torpedoes. I-29 sank immediately at 20.10°N 121.55°E with the loss of Kinashi and all but one member of his crew.

Kinashi was promoted posthumously two levels in rank to rear admiral.
