= Takaichi (disambiguation) =

Sanae Takaichi (born 1961) is the Prime Minister of Japan.

Takaichi may also refer to:

- Kengo Takaichi (born 1993), Japanese judoka
- Takakazu Kinashi (1902–1944), Japanese submarine commander
- Taku Takaichi (born 1952), Japanese politician and husband of Sanae Takaichi
- Takaichi District, Nara
