= Tilawa (disambiguation) =

Tilawa is a recitation of the Quran, the Islamic Holy book.

Tilawa or Tilawah may also refer to:

- Sujud Tilawa, a Sujud during Quran recitation.
- Tilawah Al-Quran, an international Quran recital competition
- Majlis Tilawah Al-Quran competition, a Malaysian football competition
- SS Tilawa, a ship sunk in the Indian Ocean during WWII.
