= Guang Da Xing No. 28 incident =

Fatal shooting incident in disputed waters between the Philippines and Taiwan

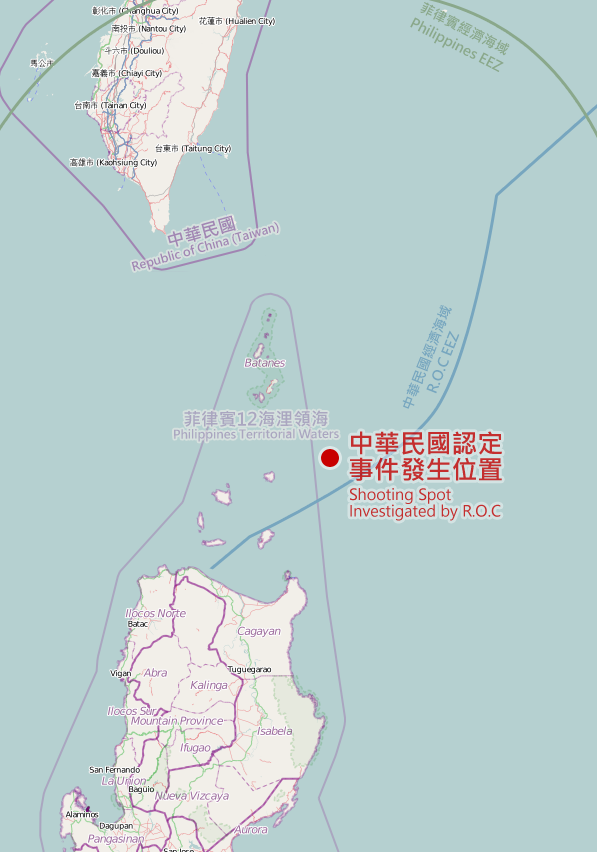
- Location of the shooting incident, the territorial waters and EEZ claimed by both countries. It is 43 nautical miles from the nearest Philippine land territory and 170 nautical miles from the nearest Taiwanese land territory.
- Date: 9 May 2013
- Location: Balintang Channel 19.9965°N 122.9282°E
- Also known as: Balintang Channel incident
- Participants: Philippine Coast Guard; Taiwanese fishing boat
- Outcome: Diplomatic tension between the Philippines and the Republic of China (Taiwan) until 7 August, after which relations normalized
- Deaths: Death of a Taiwanese fisherman
- Inquiries: Investigation convened by Philippine and Taiwanese governments
- Charges: Homicide charges recommended against eight Philippine Coast Guard personnel

The Guang Da Xing No. 28 incident was a fatal shooting incident that occurred on 9 May 2013 involving the 15-ton Taiwanese fishing boat Guang Da Xing No. 28 and the 90-ton Philippine Coast Guard patrol boat Maritime Control Surveillance 3001, resulting in the death of a 65-year old Taiwanese fisherman Hung Shih-cheng (洪石成) by gunfire from the Philippine vessel.

The incident occurred within the disputed and overlapping exclusive economic zones of the Philippines and Taiwan. After the incident, Taiwan imposed sanctions and conducted a two-day "safety and rescue drill" with its Naval and Coast Guard forces near the waters where the incident occurred, on the grounds that the killing took place within its exclusive economic zone and the Philippine authority's action was in violation of international law. A Philippine official stated that the shooting was a reaction to the threat of being rammed. The incident came under separate investigations by Taiwanese and Philippine authorities; Taiwanese authorities presented evidence of more than 50 bullet holes found on the fishing boat, while Philippine authorities examined a video tape recording of the incident.

The Philippines released the result of the National Bureau of Investigation's inquiry into the incident on 7 August 2013; the NBI recommended homicide charges against eight Philippine Coast Guard personnel involved in the shooting and recommended sanctions against four others for allegedly trying to alter evidence. A day after the release of the investigation report, a representative of the Philippine government traveled to Taiwan to officially apologize to the victim's family. Taiwan subsequently lifted the sanctions it imposed against the Philippines and issued a statement announcing that relations between the two countries have normalized.

== Background ==
Taiwan, the Philippines and China contest control of fishing waters in the South China Sea. On May 7, Chinese media reported that a large number of Chinese fishing vessels were on their way to disputed waters for a 40-day fishing expedition. The announcement provoked an angry response by some politicians in the Philippines, where an election was scheduled for May 13. Walden Bello, a spokesman for the "left" Akbayan party in a coalition with the ruling Liberal Party, called the fishing flotilla "tantamount to an invasion" and warned that Chinese "naval warships and troops" might follow. Taiwanese fishing vessels were also in the region.

== Incident ==
On 9 May 2013, the Taiwanese fishing boat Guang Da Xing No. 28 (Chinese: 廣大興28號; pinyin: Guǎngdàxīng Èrshíbā Hào; Pe̍h-ōe-jī: Kóng-tāi-hing Jī-tsa̍p-peh Hō) was operating about 164 nautical miles southeast of Cape Eluanbi, Taiwan. The vessel was captained by Captain Hung Yu-chih (洪育智); other crew members on board included the captain's father, Hung Shih-cheng (洪石成), the captain's brother-in-law, Hung Jie-shang and an Indonesian national.

The Filipino Maritime Control Surveillance 3001 (MCS-3001), a 35-meter vessel jointly crewed by the Philippine Coast Guard and Bureau of Fisheries and Aquatic Resources personnel, detected two fishing boats at 43 nautical miles east of Balintang Island, an area that is within the overlapped EEZs of both Taiwan and the Philippines. Without warning, the Philippine Coast Guard opened fire on the fishing boat during a 50-minute chase that ended around 10:00 am. Fifty-nine (59) bullet holes (45 of which were entry holes) were found on the vessel and the slugs were identified as coming from a semi-automatic rifle. The vessel suffered significant damage, including engine failure, while the main deck experienced severe and concentrated attack, based on the distribution of the bullet holes.

=== Location ===
The incident occurred in the overlapping exclusive economic zones between the Philippines and Taiwan. The site of the incident is 43 nautical miles east of Balintang Island according to the Philippine Bureau of Fisheries and Aquatic Resources and 170 nautical miles south of Taiwan according to Taiwan's Ministry of Foreign Affairs, both well within the 200 nautical mile range prescribed by the United Nations Convention on the Law of the Sea. An exception to the 200 nautical mile rule occurs when exclusive economic zones would overlap; that is, state coastal baselines are less than 400 nmi (740 km) apart as it was in this case. When an overlap occurs, it is up to the states to delineate the actual maritime boundary. Generally, any point within an overlapping area defaults to the nearest state.

=== Death of Hung Shih-cheng ===
As the first response, the Coast Guard Administration of Taiwan dispatched the 2,000-ton ROCCGC Tainan (CG-126) to the rescue of the stricken vessel and escort it back to its home port. Two Taiwanese fishing vessels assisted in the effort to tow the Guang Da Xing No. 28 back to Taiwan under the escort of the CGA. The incident led to the death of Taiwanese national Hung Shih-cheng (洪石成), who was 65.

The Philippine Coast Guard initially denied they had any ship in the vicinity but later said that its personnel had opened fire in self-defense. On 15 May 2013, the President of the Philippines, Benigno Aquino III, dispatched the chairman of the Manila Economic and Cultural Office, Amadeo R. Perez, to Taipei as his personal representative to make an unofficial apology for the death of the Taiwanese fisherman. However, Taiwan President Ma Ying-jeou rejected the apology, which had described the shooting as "unfortunate" and "unintentional". Calling the Filipino attack of the unarmed fishing boat "brutal and cold-hearted", he insisted that Manila offer a formal apology and just compensation. The Philippines publicly welcomed a joint investigation with Taiwanese investigators on the incident in the first place, but later denied that it had ever made such an offer and rejected the joint investigation when Taiwanese investigators arrived in Manila. Justice Secretary Leila de Lima stated that she would allow Taiwan to conduct an investigation parallel to that being conducted by the National Bureau of Investigation.

== Claims and investigations ==
=== Philippines ===
On May 10, Philippine Coast Guard Commandant Rear Admiral Rodolfo Isorena stated that the Taiwanese fishing boat together with another vessel were halted by the crew of MCS-3001 for an on-board inspection. The smaller of the two Taiwanese fishing boats did not respond to the warning and tried to ram the Philippine Coast Guard vessel. The commanding officer of MCS-3001 then gave the order to open fire at Guang Ta Hsin-28 to disable its engine. Two unidentified vessels then arrived in the area, apparently to rescue the disabled Taiwanese vessel, prompting MCS-3001 to disengage and leave.

On May 17, investigators from the National Bureau of Investigation said that there are signs that the Philippine Coast Guard may have violated their so-called rules of engagement.

The National Bureau of Investigation disclosed the results of their investigation on 7 August 2013, recommending the filing of homicide charges against the Philippine Coast Guard personnel involved in the shooting. The NBI stated that eight crewmen were found to have fired at the Taiwanese vessel. The investigation report also stated that the shooting occurred within Philippine territory in the waterway off the Batanes Islands. In addition, the NBI also recommended that charges of obstruction of justice be filed against four Philippine Coast Guard personnel for tampering with evidence related to the shooting incident.

=== Taiwan ===
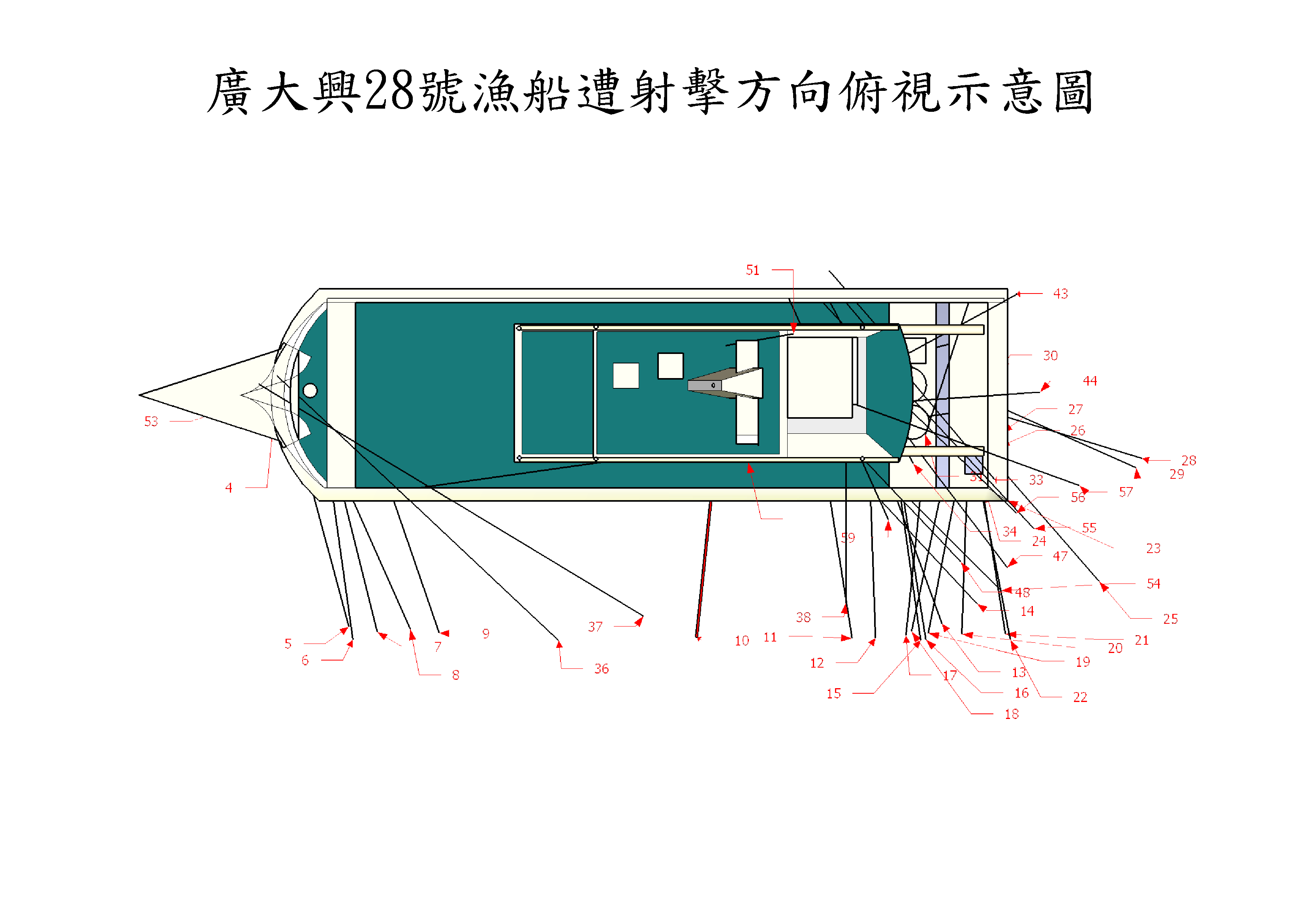
Bullet trajectories on Guang Da Xing No. 28 (Top view) as determined by Taiwanese forensic investigators

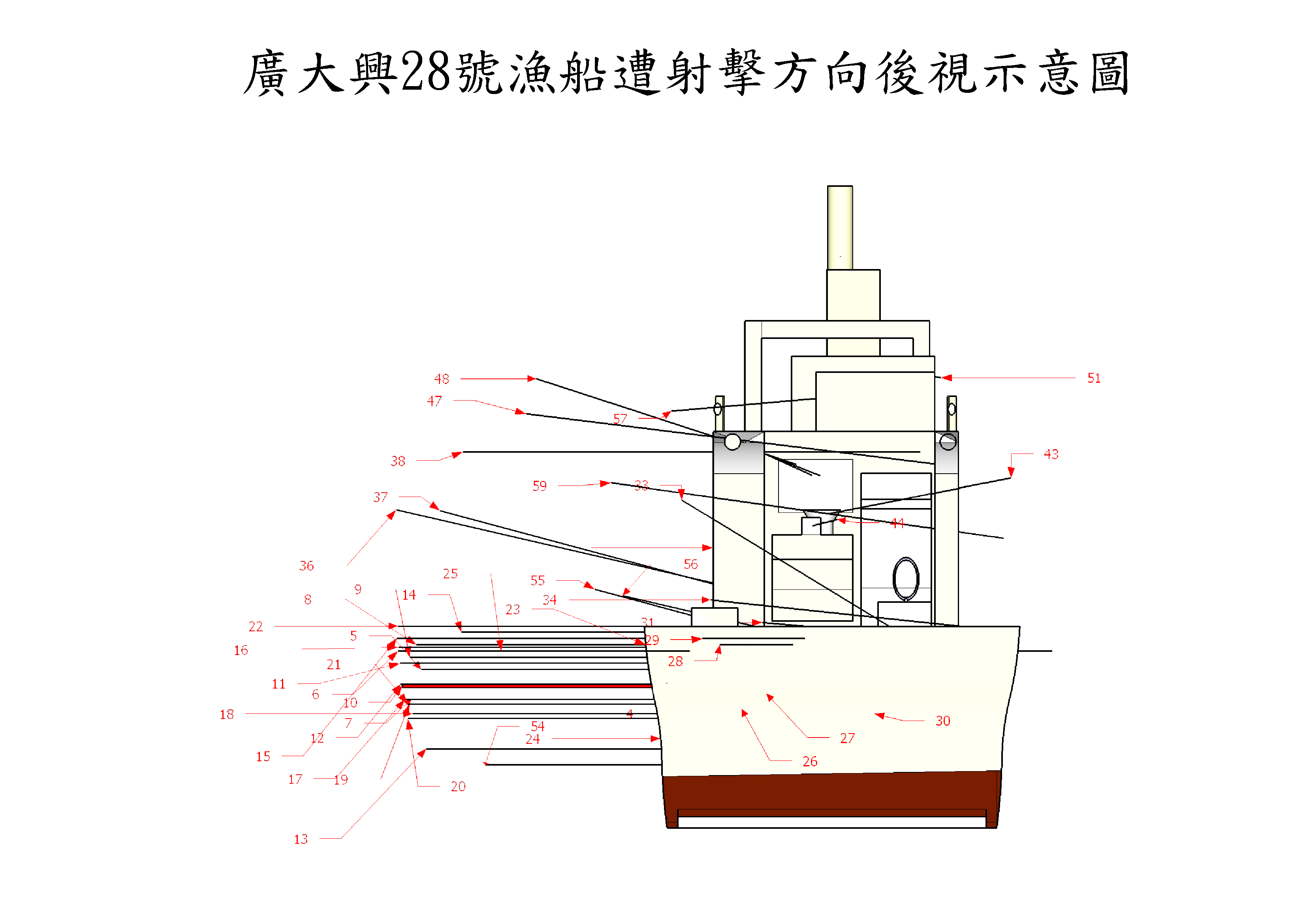
Bullet trajectories on Guang Da Xing No. 28 (Rear view) as determined by Taiwanese forensic investigators

The victim's son, Hung Yu-chih (洪育智), rebutted the Philippine Coast Guard's claim, stating that the 15-ton Guang Da Xing No. 28 had a much lower speed compared to the 90-ton PCG vessel. He said their immediate reaction was to flee when the fishing boat encountered the armed Filipino vessel and allegations that the fishing boat had tried to ram the PCG vessel was self-serving and baseless.

The Ministry of Justice published an investigation report on May 15, indicating that 45 bullets hit the boat and that no signs of a collision were found on the boat, refuting the Philippine's claim that the Taiwanese boat had rammed the Filipino vessel. The report further states that there were total of 59 bullet holes with at least one under the waterline and four near the cabin where the crew was hiding, inferring that the PCG intended to kill the crew. According to the voyage data recorder, the shooting occurred at 19°59'47.27"N and 122°55'41.37"E, which is outside the Philippines' territorial waters, but within the shared EEZ. The report further stated that Hung Shih-cheng died of respiratory failure and hemorrhage caused by a single gunshot wound to the neck inflicted by a 7.62 mm caliber ammunition commonly used in weapons such as the M14 rifle, the M240 machine gun and the M60 machine gun. It gave his manner of death as homicide.

== Reaction ==
=== Public ===
==== In the Philippines ====
Amid rumors of OFW abuse in Taiwan regarding the incident, former policeman Abner Afuang burned the Taiwanese flag in protest and urged the Taiwanese to "show some respect". Contingency measures were being arranged for OFWs in case the situation escalates according to Undersecretary Abigail Valte, deputy presidential spokesperson.

Harry Roque, then an associate professor at the University of the Philippines College of Law, stated that Taiwan is not a recognized sovereign body, hence has no right to force the Philippines into signing a fishing agreement. Under international law however, he said that Taiwan is entitled to compensation and an apology which should not be made by any higher ranking Philippine official other than the Manila Economic and Cultural Office representative.

==== In Taiwan ====
A protest by 200 Taiwanese outside the Manila Economic and Cultural Office in Taipei was held condemning the Philippine government and sympathizing with the dead fisherman. They also burned Philippine flags as part of the protests. The Republic of China (Taiwan) President Ma Ying-jeou urged the Taiwanese people not to vent their anger on Filipinos working in Taiwan and stated that the Philippine government should be held responsible. He insisted that like their Taiwanese fishermen, the Filipino migrant workers are making a living in Taiwan. Ma also suggested that a fishery agreement will help solve its maritime dispute with the Philippines.

Rights groups in Taiwan also echoed the President's call to the Taiwanese people to refrain from targeting Filipinos in Taiwan. TransAsia Sisterhood Taiwan executive secretary Ly Vuoch, a Cambodian immigrant in Taiwan also insisted that not only Filipinos feel threatened when walking in the streets following the incident, but also other immigrants from Southeast Asia. Chen Hsiu-lien, policy researcher from the Taiwan International Workers’ Association, urged the Taiwanese public not to vent their anger towards the Philippine government on Filipino migrant workers. Chen also claimed that President Ma is encouraging people to vent their anger on Filipino workers and insisted that "he would not have waited until now to ask people not to do so."

==== Internet hackers ====
Computer hackers in Taiwan took down or defaced Filipino government websites, while Filipino hackers attempted to do the same to Taiwan. Both groups claimed to be members of the hactivist group Anonymous.

=== Governmental ===
==== Philippines ====
Deputy Presidential spokesperson Abigail Valte said the ramming by a Taiwanese boat in Philippine territorial waters as "an aggressive act." Philippine Coast Guard (PCG) spokesman Commander Armand Balilo stated that the Filipino personnel had been properly carrying out their duties. He was quoted as saying, "If somebody died, they deserve sympathy but not an apology."

PCG Commandant Admiral Rodolfo Isorena vowed a thorough investigation into the incident and has already relieved 11 PCG personnel.

On May 15, President Benigno Aquino III assigned Manila Economic and Cultural Office (MECO) chairman Amadeo R. Perez, Jr. to be his personal representative to convey "his and the Filipino people’s deep regret and apology to the family". When asked if this is an apology on behalf of the Philippine government, the presidential spokesperson Edwin Lacierda replied: "You take my statement as it is." Aquino also tasked the National Bureau of Investigation (NBI) to conduct a probe on the incident however rejected to investigate the incident with the Taiwanese government. Presidential spokesperson Edwin Lacierda also added that the video of the shooting incident will also be part of the investigation.

==== Taiwan ====
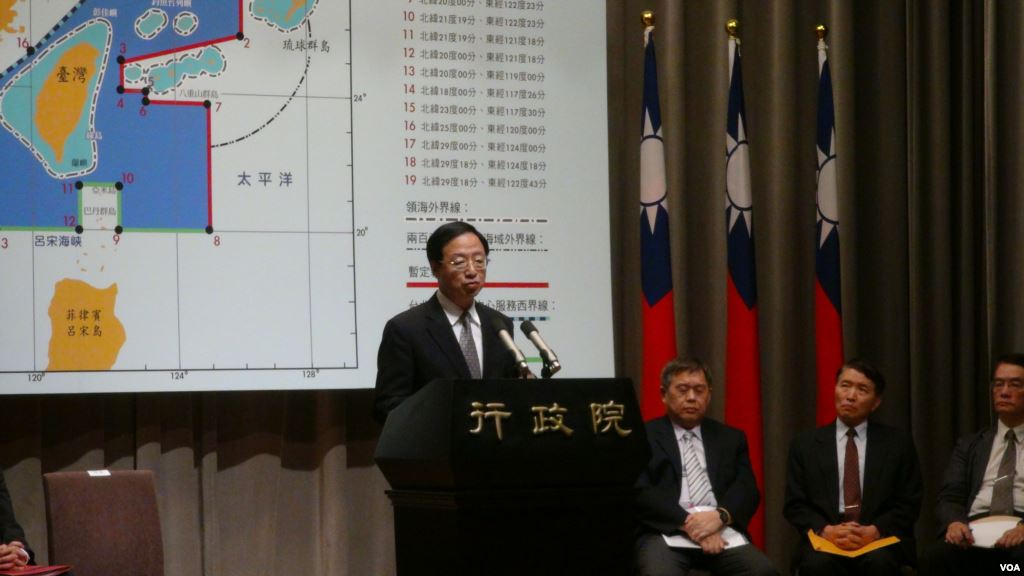
Premier Jiang Yi-huah making public statement regarding the shooting incident at the Executive Yuan.

May 9, 2013, on the day of incident, the Republic of China (Taiwan) Ministry of Foreign Affair expressed the concern to the government of the Philippines and urge them to investigate and bring the murder to justice. The ROC government issued a formal condemnation to the unjustified act by the Filipino officials on May 11. President Ma Ying-jeou subsequently demanded the Filipino government to respond to these four solemn requests within the next 72 hours:

- Issue a formal apology
- Speed up of the investigation into the fisherman's death, and punish the perpetrators
- Compensate the deceased fisherman's family
- Start talks over fishing rights in the overlapped EEZ area.

The ROC government urged the Filipino government to act upon these requests without delay, or the Filipino representative would be sent back to Manila.

On May 12, Taiwan sent additional three Coast Guard cutters and one Navy warship carrying a S70-C helicopter to safeguard the Taiwanese fishing boats within its southern EEZ waters, and ignoring the Filipino EEZ claim. Next day, on May 15, one hour passed the 72-hour deadline, Minister of Foreign Affairs David Lin termed the Philippines' response as ambiguous and needed more "clarity," and was not at all satisfied with the Filipino responses to the four requests. With the deterioration of the diplomatic relations between both sides, Premier Jiang Yi-huah issued several sanctions to the Filipino authorities, and authorized a joint Navy and Coast Guard "Safety and Rescue Drill" which involved Kidd-class DDG ROCS Ma Kong, La Fayette-class FFG ROCS Chen De carrying one S-70C, Mirage 2000-5 and F-CK-1 IDF fighters, E-2 early-warning aircraft, as well as Coast Guard cutters at the overlapped EEZ area on the next day. In the meantime, Minister of Foreign Affairs David Lin issued a "Red Alert" traveling status to the Philippines, strongly discouraged any Taiwanese from traveling to the Philippines, signifying boycotting of tourism to the Philippines for political purposes, such as Boracay and other scenic spots. As of 21 May 2013, Boracay's hotels and resorts have been reporting cancellations by Taiwanese tourists, costing an estimated $55.3 million in revenue losses.

==== Others ====
- China – China's Ministry of Foreign Affairs spokeswoman Hua Chunying strongly condemned the Philippines' "barbaric" shooting of the Taiwanese fishing boat and strongly urged the Philippines to "investigate the case immediately and handle the issue properly". Sino-Filipino diplomatic relations have deteriorated after the Scarborough Shoal dispute and the Manila hostage crisis in 2010, which resulted in the deaths of eight Hong Kong tourists by former PNP officer Rolando Mendoza.
- United States – United States Department of State spokesperson Patrick Ventrell stated that the USA welcomes the Philippines' pledge to conduct a full and transparent investigation, urging all parties to ensure maritime safety and to refrain from "actions that could escalate tensions in the region and undermine the prospects for a diplomatic or other peaceful resolution of differences". Later, the Chairman Steve Chabot and ranking member Eni Faleomavaega of the House Foreign Affairs Subcommittee on Asia and the Pacific made a joint statement indicating that this attack happened "in waters considered by both Taiwan and the Philippines to be within Taiwan’s 200 nautical-mile-from-shore Exclusive Economic Zone." Further, it states that "A government vessel's shooting of an unarmed fishing boat is an act of violence, and is in violation of international law. Therefore, we call upon the Philippines to promptly and sincerely respond to the requests of the Taiwan government to apologize, punish the perpetrators, and provide proper compensation to the victim's family based on humanitarian grounds."

== Aftermath ==
On 7 August the same year, the Philippine National Bureau of Investigation recommended that eight Philippine Coast Guard personnel involved in the shooting should be charged with homicide. They also recommended sanctions against four other personal who were attempting to alter evidence. The next day on 8 August, a Philippine delegation apologized to the victim's family. In response, Taiwan lifted the sanctions that had been imposed against the Philippines. Relations between the two countries subsequently returned to normal. In September 2019, the eight were convicted and sentenced to 8–15 years imprisonment; each of the eight was also ordered to pay P100,000 in civil damages.

== See also ==
- Sino-Philippine Treaty of Amity
- Capture of the Tuapse
- Philippines–Taiwan relations
