= USS Venus =

Cargo ship of the United States Navy

History

United States
- Name: William Williams
- Namesake: William Williams
- Owner: War Shipping Administration (WSA)
- Operator: Isthmian Steamship Company
- Ordered: as a Type EC2-S-C1 hull, MCE hull 263
- Builder: Permanente Metals Corporation, Richmond, California
- Yard number: 63
- Way number: 5
- Laid down: 5 July 1942
- Launched: 21 August 1942
- Sponsored by: Mrs. Paul S. Marrin
- In service: 8 September 1942
- Honors and awards: 1 × battle stars
- Fate: transferred to the US Navy, 6 November 1943

United States
- Name: Venus
- Namesake: The planet Venus
- Acquired: 6 November 1943
- Commissioned: 10 November 1943
- Recommissioned: 26 September 1944
- Decommissioned: 4 December 1943; 18 April 1946
- In service: 4 December 1943
- Stricken: 19 February 1948
- Identification: Hull symbol: AK-135; Code letters: NHCX
- Fate: Sold for scrapping, 18 April 1961

General characteristics
- Class & type: Crater-class cargo ship
- Displacement: 4,023 long tons (4,088 t) (standard); 14,550 long tons (14,780 t) (full load)
- Length: 441 ft 6 in (134.57 m)
- Beam: 56 ft 11 in (17.35 m)
- Draft: 28 ft 4 in (8.64 m)
- Installed power: 2 × Babcock & Wilcox header-type boilers, 220psi 450°; 2,500 shp (1,900 kW)
- Propulsion: 1 × American Ship Building Company triple-expansion reciprocating steam engine; 1 × shaft
- Speed: 12.5 kn (23.2 km/h; 14.4 mph)
- Capacity: 7,800 t (7,700 long tons) DWT; 444,206 cu ft (12,578.5 m^{3}) (non-refrigerated)
- Complement: 240
- Armament: 1 × 5 in (127 mm)/38-caliber dual-purpose gun; 1 × 3 in (76 mm)/50-caliber dual-purpose gun; 2 × 40 mm (1.6 in) Bofors anti-aircraft (AA) gun mounts; 8 × 20 mm (0.8 in) Oerlikon cannons AA mounts

USS Venus (AK-135) was a Crater-class cargo ship in the service of the United States Navy in World War II. Originally liberty ship SS William Williams, named after William Williams, a signer of the Declaration of Independence, it was taken over by the Navy after being damaged in a torpedo attack and renamed after the planet Venus. It was the only ship of the Navy to bear this name.

== Construction ==
William Williams was laid down on 5 July 1942, under a Maritime Commission (MARCOM) contract, MCE hull 263, by Permanente Metals Corporation, Yard No. 2, Richmond, California; launched on 21 August; sponsored by Mrs. Paul S. Marrin; was delivered to her owners, the Isthmian Steamship Company, on 8 September; and operated in the Pacific for the remainder of 1942 and into 1943.

== Merchant history ==
On 2 May 1943, while near Suva, Fiji Islands, William Williams was torpedoed by the Japanese submarine I-19, commanded by Lt. Takaichi Kinashi who, while commanding this I-boat, had torpedoed the aircraft carrier Wasp, battleship North Carolina, and the destroyer O'Brien, with the same spread of torpedoes off Guadalcanal on 15 September 1942. Kinashi chose not to finish off the crippled Liberty ship, however, and cleared the area. William Williams, meanwhile, abandoned by her crew, remained afloat though heavily damaged.

At the time she was torpedoed, she was carrying lumber. Any other time, she would have been carrying munitions and surely would have been lost. With quick thinking by Captain Freeman, he ordered an immediate abandonment of the ship by most of her crew but Captain Freeman stayed behind with a small crew to put out the fires. Captain Freeman also ordered the radio operator, "Sparks" as they were called, to send out a distress signal that they were sinking rapidly with the hope that the Japanese ship would intercept the message. Believing the ship would blow from a cargo of munitions or believing that the ship was sinking and seeing the crew so hastily leave the ship, the Japanese vessel cleared the area believing a fatal blow had been struck. After the fires were put out, the crew returned and William Williams built steam to continue to port. A Navy tug was sent out to pull her in but if need be, the William Williams could have made it on her own. Captain Freeman received a commendation for saving William Williams.

== Service history ==
William Williams was towed to Fiji and thence to Auckland, New Zealand, where the Navy acquired the ship on 6 November 1943, from the War Shipping Administration (WSA) under a bareboat charter. Enough repairs to make the ship seaworthy at Naval Base Sydney, were effected, and she was commissioned as Venus on 10 November.

Towed from Auckland, Venus arrived at Sydney, Australia, where she was decommissioned and placed "in service" on 4 December.

The ship was one of five Navy crewed Liberties assigned 8 December 1943 to the Southwest Pacific Area for service under operational control of the Commander, Seventh Fleet in meeting Army requirements; however, due to the damage and delay another Liberty was assigned.

Docking and conversion work at the port were delayed due to higher priorities being assigned to other ships and labor troubles at the dockyards themselves. Once these obstacles were overcome, work proceeded apace — a difficult task because the conversion was accomplished in a foreign yard with non-standard materials. Designated AK-135, the ship was placed back in commission on 26 September 1944. On 4 October, she commenced her shakedown and soon loaded general cargo and dry provisions before she sailed for the Admiralties on 26 October.

She reached Manus four days later and discharged some of her cargo. There, she also received her main battery, a single 5-inch (127 mm)/38, dual-purpose gun. The ship witnessed an air raid on 9 November, but the attack was directed at another vicinity, and the cargo vessel did not participate in the action. The following day, Mount Hood blew up in a cataclysmic explosion while handling ammunition at Seeadler Harbor. All but a few of her crew, those who were ashore at the time, were killed in the blast which not only atomized the ammunition ship but severely damaged other ships nearby. Venus responded to this emergency by sending a boat to assist in medical operations with 30 units of blood plasma.

During the ship's stay at Manus, several cases of diphtheria developed on board, and all hands were restricted to the ship. On 28 November, Venus sailed for Dutch New Guinea, arrived at Hollandia the following day, and stayed until Christmas Eve, when she headed for Aitape – arriving there on Christmas Day. On 27 December 1944, the cargo vessel got underway for Cape Sansapor, where she supplied LST’s attached to Task Group (TG) 77.5, which later took part in the landings at Lingayen Gulf. Proceeding to Morotai upon completion of these operations, she unloaded the remainder of her cargo and fueled various small craft of the Royal Australian Navy.

On 4 January 1945, during Venus’ stay at Morotai, Japanese aircraft conducted a bombing raid on the nearby land base, but the planes were driven off by antiaircraft fire and night fighters. Six days later, Venus, her holds empty, sailed with five other ships to Hollandia, where she took on board passengers. While proceeding thence to Australia, she encountered heavy gales but arrived safely at Brisbane on 23 January.

The ship underwent repairs soon after she arrived while concurrently loading equipment of the 109th Fleet Hospital unit and of the 544th Construction Battalion (CB or "Seabees") for transport to the Philippines. She departed Brisbane on 4 February, proceeded via Manus and Hollandia, and joined a convoy off the Dutch New Guinea coast. The Allied ships arrived at Guiuan Roadstead off Samar on 27 February. Part of the Seabee unit soon went ashore to begin building the hospital, while the remainder stayed on board to unload equipment and stores. Eventually, as more Seabees could be accommodated ashore, the job of unloading passed on to Venus’ crew. Despite the lack of barges and experienced stevedores, Venus succeeded in unloading all equipment and supplies earmarked for the hospital unit before she joined a southbound convoy on 8 April, got underway for the Admiralties, and arrived at Manus one week later.

Proceeding thence to Emirau, Venus loaded the remnants of the 77th Construction Battalion and their equipment, accomplishing this on 25 April before getting underway for Brisbane to load more of the 77th Battalion's equipment. Besides the full load of cargo, Venus also accommodated 600 passengers, and additional galley and bunking facilities were set up on deck beneath makeshift shelters to take care of these men. The cargo vessel then headed north for the Philippines, via Milne Bay, and arrived at Manila on 13 June to commence offloading and to disembark her passengers. Five days later, the ship shifted to a berth alongside a sunken Japanese cargo ship.

With the erstwhile enemy freighter serving as a dock, Venus offloaded the remainder of her cargo — experiencing two air raid alerts during her stay at Manila — and completed these operations by 30 June. She then pressed southward for the Admiralties and loaded 1,500 long tons (1,500 t) of bombs for transport to Bougainville in the Solomons. The installation of a gyro compass delayed her sailing until 25 July, but the ship arrived at Empress Augusta Bay on 29 July.

Eleven days later, Venus departed Torokina, Bougainville, bound for the New Hebrides and arrived at Espiritu Santo on 11 August. She loaded material for dry dock ABSD-1, loading from lighters in Pallikulo Bay. Due to poor loading conditions, the job was not completed until 7 September, when she was ready to sail for the Philippines. During her stay at Espiritu Santo, word arrived that Japan had surrendered; and, for the first time since commissioning, the ship could sail at night without having to "darken ship".

Venus arrived at Samar on 20 September, and discharged her cargo before moving on to Subic Bay. She sailed from Cebu on 15 December, bound for the Hawaiian Islands, and arrived at Pearl Harbor on 16 March.

== Post war and decommission ==
Decommissioned on 18 April 1946, the ship was subsequently towed by Hitchiti to the west coast, departing Pearl Harbor on 5 December 1947, and arriving at San Francisco on 13 December.

Declared surplus to Navy needs, the ship was struck from the Navy list on 19 February 1948. Stripped for disposal, she was returned to MARCOM on 27 February, and was placed in the National Defense Reserve Fleet at Suisun Bay, California.

Venus was sold for scrapping on 18 April 1961, to Union Minerals and Alloys Corporation, for $59,339.89. She was delivered 21 August 1961, with scrapping completed 21 October 1961.

== Awards ==
Venus received one battle star for her service during World War II as William Williams. Her crew were eligible for the following medals:

- Combat Action Ribbon (retroactive SS William Williams, 2 May 1943)
- American Campaign Medal
- Asiatic-Pacific Campaign Medal (1)
- World War II Victory Medal
- Philippine Liberation Medal

== Notes ==
Citations

== Bibliography ==
Online resources

- "Venus". Dictionary of American Naval Fighting Ships. Naval History and Heritage Command. 21 October 2015. This article incorporates text from this source, which is in the public domain.
- "Kaiser Permanente No. 2, Richmond CA". www.ShipbuildingHistory.com. 13 October 2010.
- "USS Venus (AK-135)". NavSource. 11 July 2014.
- "Venus". United States Department of Transportation. Archived from the original on December 12, 2019.
- "WILLIAM WILLIAMS". United States Department of Transportation. Archived from the original on December 12, 2019.

Books

- Masterson, Dr. James R. (1949). U. S. Army Transportation In The Southwest Pacific Area 1941-1947. Washington, D. C.: Transportation Unit, Historical Division, Special Staff, U. S. Army.
