= Balintang Channel =

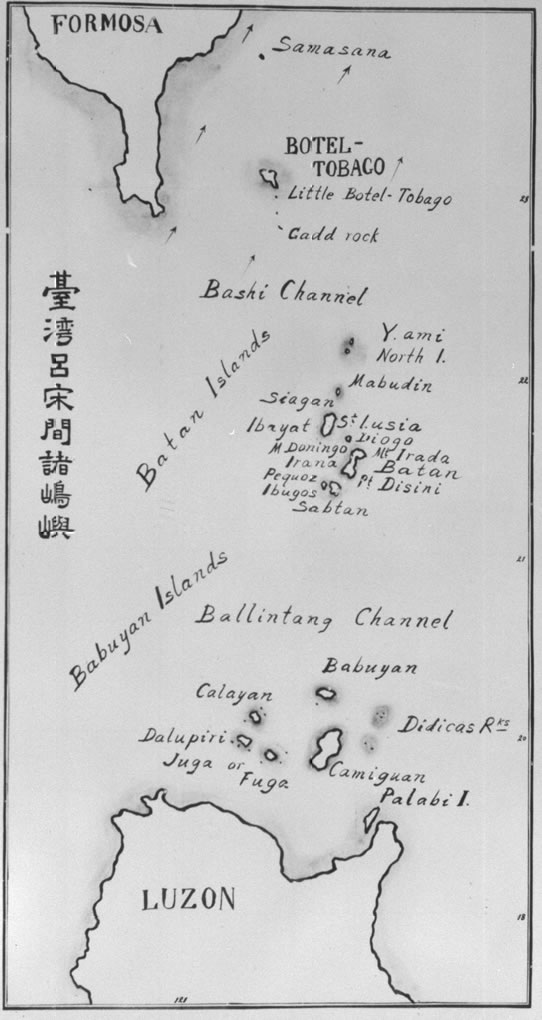
- Balintang is the southern channel of the Luzon Strait

- Location within the Philippines Balintang Channel (Philippines)
- Location: Luzon Strait
- Coordinates: 19°49′0.84″N 121°39′59.4″E
- Type: Channel
- Etymology: Balintang Islands
- Part of: Luzon Strait

The Balintang Channel (/ˈbɑːlɪntɑːŋ/ BAH-lin-tahng;Filipino: Tsanel ng Balintang, Kipot ng Balintang) is a small waterway that separates the Batanes Group of Islands from the Babuyan Group Islands, both of which belong to the Philippines and are located in the vicinity of the Luzon Strait.

== Notable events ==
=== 1944 incident ===
In July 1944, the Imperial Japanese Navy cargo submarine I-29 was torpedoed and sunk in this channel by American Navy submarine USS Sawfish.

=== 2013 shooting incident ===
The 2013 Guang Da Xing No. 28 incident, also known as the Balintang Channel incident, was a fatal shooting incident that occurred on 9 May 2013 involving the Taiwanese fishing boat Guang Da Xing No. 28 and the Philippine Coast Guard (PCG) patrol boat Maritime Control Surveillance 3001, which led to the death of Taiwanese fisherman Hung Shih-cheng (洪石成) by gunfire from the Philippine vessel. The Philippines' National Bureau of Investigation recommended that homicide charges be filed against the eight PCG personnel.

== See also ==
- Balintang Islands
