= Grant, Oklahoma =

Unincorporated community in Oklahoma, US

- Unincorporated community
- Location within the state of Oklahoma
- Coordinates: 33°56′19″N 95°30′56″W
- Country: United States
- State: Oklahoma
- County: Choctaw

Area
  - Total: 1.91 sq mi (4.95 km^{2})
  - Land: 1.88 sq mi (4.86 km^{2})
  - Water: 0.031 sq mi (0.08 km^{2})
- Elevation: 459 ft (140 m)

Population (2020)
  - Total: 190
  - Density: 101.2/sq mi (39.06/km^{2})
- Time zone: UTC-6 (Central (CST))
  - Summer (DST): UTC-5 (CDT)
- ZIP codes: 74738
- FIPS code: 40-31000
- GNIS feature ID: 2629920

Grant is an unincorporated community in Choctaw County, Oklahoma, United States. It is located along U.S. Route 271, south of Hugo. As of the 2020 census, Grant had a population of 190.

== History ==
The community was founded as a station stop on the St. Louis and San Francisco Railroad, which opened through the Indian Territory in June 1887. A post office opened at Grant, Indian Territory on January 31, 1889. It was named for President Ulysses S. Grant.

At the time of its founding, Grant was located in Kiamitia County, a part of the Apukshunnubbee District of the Choctaw Nation.

== Demographics ==
Historical population
Census	Pop.	Note	%±
2010	289		—
2020	190		−34.3%
U.S. Decennial Census

=== 2020 census ===
As of the 2020 census, Grant had a population of 190. The median age was 37.0 years. 24.7% of residents were under the age of 18 and 24.7% of residents were 65 years of age or older. For every 100 females there were 82.7 males, and for every 100 females age 18 and over there were 66.3 males age 18 and over.

0.0% of residents lived in urban areas, while 100.0% lived in rural areas.

There were 84 households in Grant, of which 28.6% had children under the age of 18 living in them. Of all households, 40.5% were married-couple households, 33.3% were households with a male householder and no spouse or partner present, and 22.6% were households with a female householder and no spouse or partner present. About 44.1% of all households were made up of individuals and 17.9% had someone living alone who was 65 years of age or older.

There were 103 housing units, of which 18.4% were vacant. The homeowner vacancy rate was 0.0% and the rental vacancy rate was 17.6%.

Racial composition as of the 2020 census
Race	Number	Percent
White	89	46.8%
Black or African American	48	25.3%
American Indian and Alaska Native	42	22.1%
Asian	0	0.0%
Native Hawaiian and Other Pacific Islander	0	0.0%
Some other race	6	3.2%
Two or more races	5	2.6%
Hispanic or Latino (of any race)	7	3.7%

=== 2010 census ===
As of the 2010 Census, there were 289 people, 120 households, and 82 families residing in the community. The racial composition of the city was 55.0% White, 23.9% African American, 9.3% Native American, 2.4% from other races, and 9.3% from two or more races. Hispanic or Latino of any race were 3.8% of the population.

Of the 120 households, 30.8% had children under the age of 18 living with them, 45.0% were married couples living together, 18.3% had a female householder with no husband present, and 31.7% were non-families. 29.2% of all households were made up of individuals, and 13.4% had someone living alone who was 65 years of age or older. The average household size was 2.41 and the average family size was 2.85.

In the city the population was spread out, with 21.8% under the age of 18, 10.0% from 18 to 24, 20.8% from 25 to 44, 29.4% from 45 to 64, and 18.0% who were 65 years of age or older. The median age was 42.8 years. For every 100 females, there were 88.9 males. For every 100 females age 18 and over, there were 85.2 males.

=== 2013 American Community Survey ===
According to the 2013 American Community Survey, the median income for a household in the city was $33,750 and the median income for a family was $43,942. The per capita income for the city was $18,293. About 6.9% of the population and 3.5% of families were below the poverty line, including 5.6% of those under age 18 and 25.0% of those age 65 or over.

== Notable people ==
- Alan B. Banister, U.S. Navy Rear Admiral and double Navy Cross recipient
- Mark Dinning, pop music singer
