= Japanese submarine I-29 =

Imperial Japanese Navy B1 type submarine

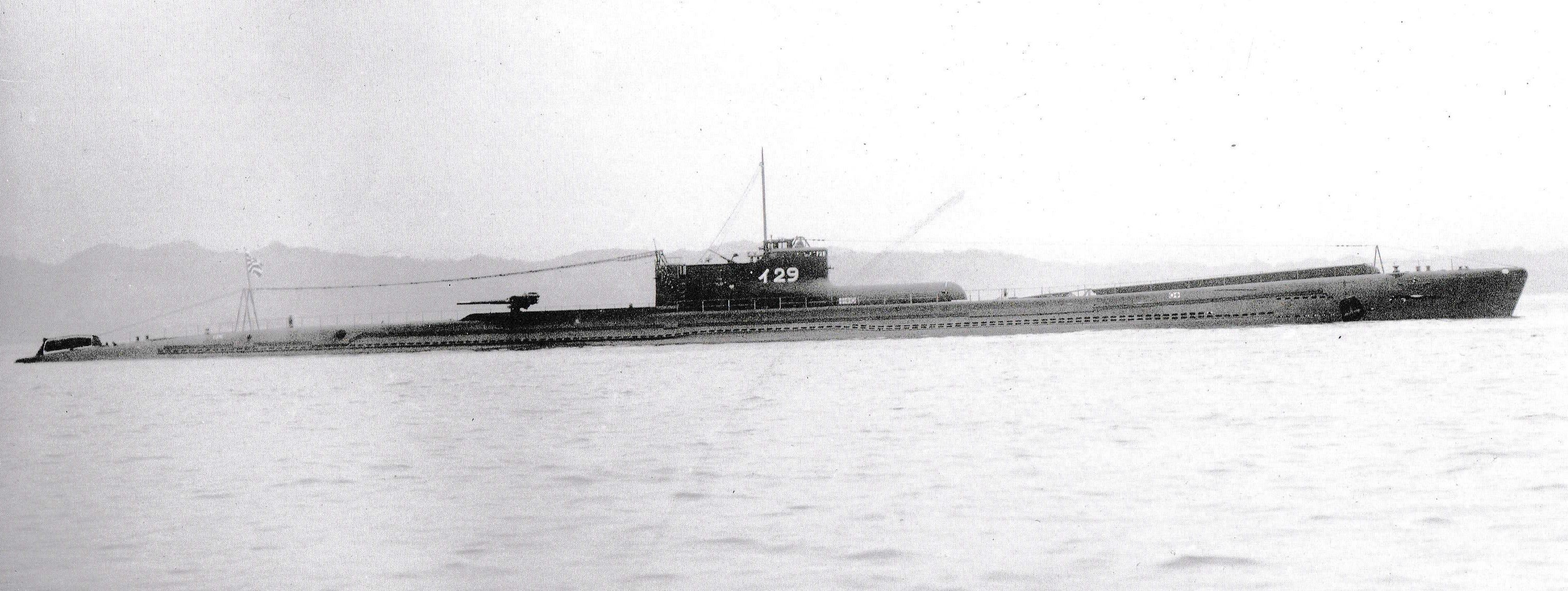
- I-29 moored off Yokosuka, February 1942

History

Japan
- Name: I-29
- Builder: Yokosuka Naval Arsenal
- Launched: 29 September 1940
- Commissioned: 27 February 1942
- Fate: Sunk, 26 July 1944

General characteristics
- Class & type: Type B1 submarine
- Displacement: 2,584 tons standard; 3,654 tons submerged
- Length: 108.5 m (356 ft 0 in)
- Beam: 9.3 m (30 ft 6 in)
- Draught: 5.12 m (16 ft 10 in)
- Propulsion: 2-shaft diesel (12,400 hp (9,200 kW)) and electric motor (2,000 hp (1,500 kW))
- Speed: 23.5 knots (44 km/h) surface, 8 knots (15 km/h) submerged
- Range: 14,000 nautical miles (26,000 km) at 16 knots (30 km/h)
- Test depth: 100 m (330 ft)
- Complement: 101 officers and men
- Armament: 6 × 533 mm torpedo tubes forward (17 torpedoes) + 1 × 14 cm/40 11th Year Type naval gun
- Aircraft carried: one Yokosuka E14Y "Glen"'Type 0' reconnaissance seaplane

I-29, code-named Matsu (松, Japanese for "pine tree"), was a B1 type submarine of the Imperial Japanese Navy used during World War II on two secret Yanagai missions with Germany, sinking seven cargo ships. She was sunk while returning from the second mission.

== Construction ==
This was the most numerous class of Japanese submarines – almost 20 were built, of which only one (I-36) survived. These boats were fast, had a long range, and carried a seaplane, launched via a forward catapult.

The keel of I-29 was laid on 20 September 1939 at the Yokosuka Naval Arsenal and launched on 29 September 1940. She was commissioned on 27 February 1942, into the 14th submarine squadron under the command of Lieutenant Commander (later Captain) Izu Juichi (伊豆壽市).

== Yanagi missions ==
The Yanagi missions fell under the Tripartite Pact which provided for an exchange of personnel, strategic materials and manufactured goods between Germany, Italy and Japan. Initially, cargo ships were used to make the exchanges, but when that was no longer possible submarines were used.

Few submarines attempted this trans-oceanic voyage during World War II: I-30 (April 1942), I-8 (June 1943), I-34 (October 1943) and the German submarines U-511 (August 1943) and U-234 (May 1945). Of these, I-30 was sunk by a mine and I-34 by the British submarine HMS Taurus. Later, the famous Japanese submarine I-52 would also share their fate. In 1945 the German U-234 had completed part of the voyage to Japan when news of Germany's surrender to the Allies was announced, and the submarine was intercepted and boarded off Newfoundland; this marked the end of the German-Japanese submarine exchanges.

== Service history ==
I-29 was completed on 27 February 1942, a few months after Japan's entry into WW2. After a series of training missions, I-29 departed Japan later that April in support of the Indian Ocean raid for her first operational mission, but did not manage to engage in combat before returning to Japan. On the 18th, I-29 attempted to track down the American aircraft carriers responsible for the Doolittle raid, but again did not see action. In May, I-29 supported the invasion of Port Moresby, where on the 14th she spotted the battleship HMS Warspite, but failed to engage in time.

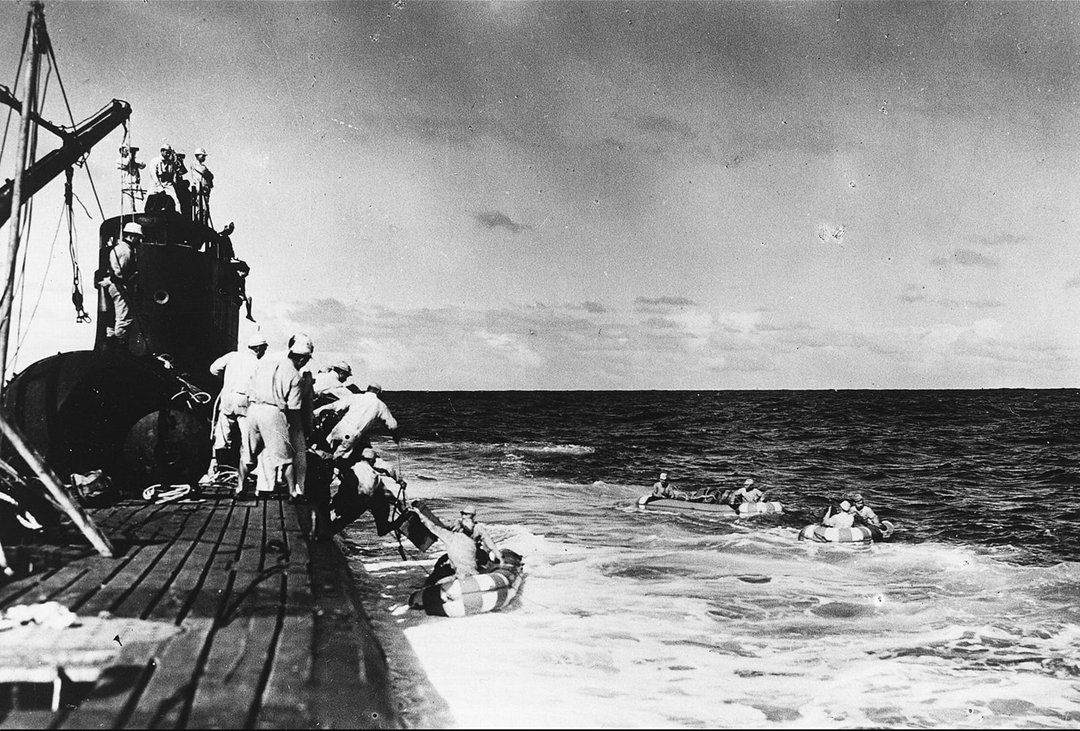
Sailors of the German submarine U-180 boarding I-29, 27 April 1943

Two days later, however, I-29 finally saw her first combat when she located the 5,135-ton Russian armed steamship Uelen transporting tin and wool, and decided to pounce on the ship, I-29 fired two torpedoes, but both missed. Surfacing, the submarine damaged Uelen with her deck gun and machine gunfire before crash diving due to counter attacks by the enemy ship. Later, I-29's reconnaissance of Sydney harbour on 23rd resulted in the attack on Sydney Harbour by Japanese midget submarines, none of which returned to their motherships by 3 June. I-29 withdrew to the north and took up station off Brisbane. While underway, I-29 was spotted by the costal passenger ship Canberra but nothing came of this encounter. I-29 spent most of June in Kwajalein before returning to Yokosuka in July where she was dry-docked for repairs and maintenance. I-29 left Yokosuka on 29 July and arrived at Penang at the turn of August, and departed on the 8th to raid enemy commerce in the Indian Ocean but failed to encounter an enemy ship for the rest of the month, only launching her floatplane on the 29th to reconnoiter the Seychelles Islands.

On 2 September, I-29 saw her first truly successful action when her crew located the 4,131-ton British armed merchant ship Gazcon, prompting I-29 to fire her torpedo battery at the target. At least one torpedo hit home and sank the vessel with ease. The day afterwards, I-29 unsuccessfully attacked the 8,553-ton British freighter British Genius, but made up for it on the 10th when she sighted the 5,299-ton British freighter Haresfield and hit the ship with two torpedoes that sent her to the bottom. Six days later, I-29 spotted the 7,147-ton British armed freighter Ocean Honour, which she promptly blasted with her 14 cm (5.5 in) deck gun and sank with the loss of 15 sailors and 5 gunners. Finally on the 22nd, I-29 spotted the 6,579-ton American armed steamship Paul Luckenbach and crippled the vessel with a torpedo hit to her port side that caused Paul Luckenbach to settle by the bow, before I-29 finished her off with a second torpedo hit an hour later. The steamship sank with 18 tanks and 10 B-25 bombers onboard.

I-29 returned to Singapore on 5 October for repairs and maintenance where she remained for the rest of the month. On 11 November, I-29 departed Penang for a raid in the Indian Ocean, culminating on 23 November when she tracked down the 10,006-ton British armed cargo ship SS Tilawa. I-29 hit Tilawa with a torpedo that caused her crew to abandon ship, but they reboarded the vessel after she stayed afloat for the next hour. However, I-29 finished off Tilawa with a second torpedo hit that caused her to sink with the loss of 280 men and over 6,472 tons of cargo. Finally on 3 December, I-29 crippled the 6,323-ton Norwegian fleet oiler Belita with a torpedo hit, then finished her off with shellfire from her deck gun.

I-29 carried out the rest of the month without action and returned to Singapore on 27 January 1943 where she was overhauled for repairs until February. From there, I-29 was transferred to the Southwest area fleet and departed Penang on 14 February for the Gulf of Bengal for operations against enemy shipping, but failed to see battle before returning to Penang in March.

=== First exchange ===
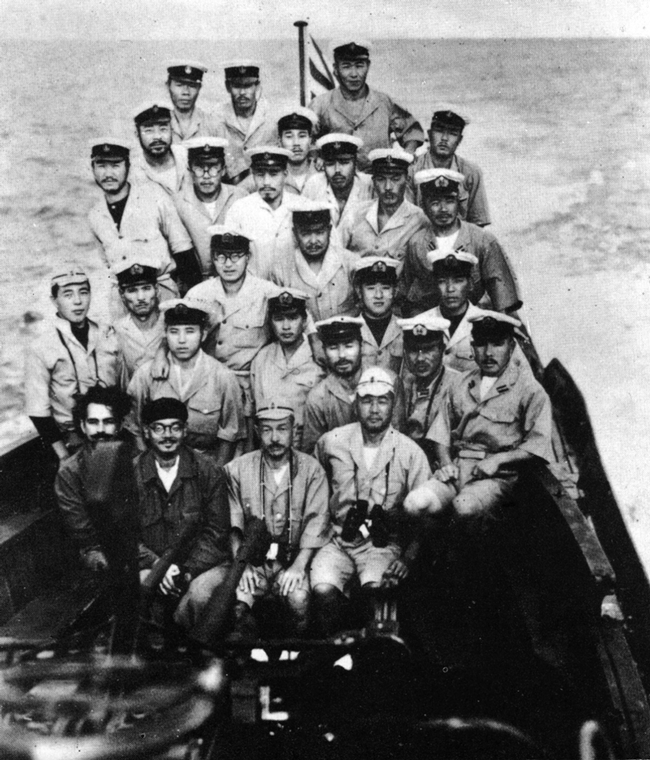
Netaji Subhas Chandra Bose, Second left, first line and his adjutant, Abid Hasan far left with the members of crew of I-29 after the exchange with U-180, 28 April 1943

In April 1943, I-29 was tasked with a Yanagi mission. She was commanded by Captain Masao Teraoka, submarine flotilla commander – indicating the importance of the trip. She left Penang with a cargo that included two tons of gold as payment from Japan for weapons technology. She met Fregattenkapitän Werner Musenberg's Type IXD-1 U-boat, U-180 on 26 April 1943 off the coast of Mozambique.

During this meeting that lasted over 12 hours due to bad weather, the two submarines swapped several important passengers. U-180 transferred Netaji Subhas Chandra Bose, a leader of the Indian Independence Movement who was going from Berlin to Tokyo, and his adjutant, Abid Hasan. I-29 in turn transferred two Japanese Navy personnel who were to study U-boat building techniques in Germany: Commander (later posthumously promoted to rear admiral) Emi Tetsushiro, and Lieutenant Commander (later posthumously promoted to captain) Tomonaga Hideo (who was later connected with the German submarine U-234). Both submarines returned safely to their bases. I-29 landed her important passengers at Sabang on Weh Island, located to the north of Sumatra on 6 May 1943, instead of Penang, to avoid detection by British spies. Bose and Hasan's transfer is the only known record of a civilian transfer between two submarines of two different navies in World War II.

On the way home, I-29 torpedoed and sank the British freighter Rahmani.

=== Second exchange ===
On 17 December 1943, I-29 was dispatched on a second Yanagi mission, this time to Lorient, France, under star Japanese submarine Commander Takakazu Kinashi, Japan's highest-scoring submarine "ace". (Note: Commanding I-19, Kinashi torpedoed and sank the U.S. aircraft carrier Wasp and damaged both the battleship North Carolina and the destroyer O'Brien during the same attack. O'Brien later sank as a result of the torpedo damage and North Carolina was under repair at Pearl Harbor until 16 November 1942) At Singapore she was loaded with 80 tons of raw rubber, 80 tons of tungsten, 50 tons of tin, two tons of zinc, and three tons of quinine, opium and coffee.

In spite of Allied Ultra decrypts of her mission, I-29 managed to reach Lorient on 11 March 1944. On her way she was refueled twice by German vessels. Also, she had three close brushes with Allied aircraft tracking her signals. One of which was an attack by six Royal Air Force aircraft including two Mosquito F Mk. XVIII fighters equipped with 57 mm cannon from No. 248 Squadron RAF off Cape Peñas, Bay of Biscay, at 43.66°N 5.85°W, and the protection provided to her during the entry into Lorient by the Luftwaffe's only long range maritime fighter unit, V Gruppe/Kampfgeschwader 40 using Junkers Ju 88s. At least one Ju 88 was shot down by British fighters over Spanish waters. The Kriegsmarine also provided an escort of two destroyers and two torpedo boats.

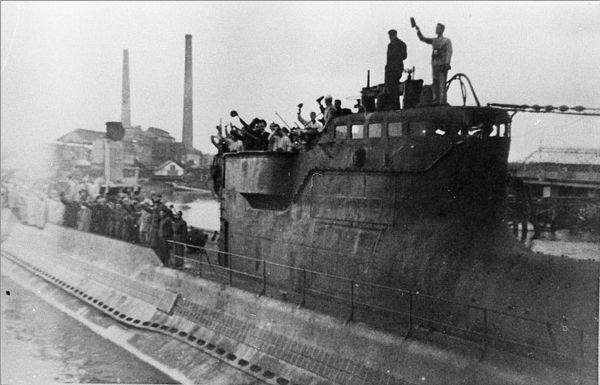
I-29 entering Lorient on her second Yanagi mission, 19 April 1944

She left Lorient 16 April 1944 for the long voyage home with a cargo of 18 passengers, torpedo boat engines, Enigma coding machines, radar components, a Walter HWK 509A rocket engine, and Messerschmitt Me 163 and Messerschmitt Me 262 blueprints for the development of the rocket plane Mitsubishi J8M. After an uneventful trip she arrived at Singapore on 14 July 1944, disembarking her passengers, though not the cargo.

=== Sinking ===
On her way back to Kure, Japan, she was attacked at Balintang Channel, Luzon Strait, near the Philippines by Commander W. D. Wilkins' "Wildcats" submarine task force: Tilefish, Rock and Sawfish, using Ultra signal intelligence. During the evening of 26 July 1944, she was spotted, on the surface, by Sawfish which fired four torpedoes at her. Three hit I-29, which sank immediately at 20.10°N 121.55°E. Only one of her crewmen survived. Kinashi was honored by a rare two-rank posthumous promotion to rear admiral.

== Summery of raiding history ==
Date	Ship	Type	GRT	Flag	Notes
16 May 1942	Uelen	Armed steamship	5,135	Soviet Union	Damaged
2 September 1942	Gazcon	Armed merchant ship	4,131	Merchant Navy	Sunk
10 September 1942	Haresfield	Freighter	5,299	Merchant Navy	Sunk
16 September 1942	Ocean Honour	Armed freighter	7,147	Merchant Navy	Sunk
22 September 1942	Paul Luckenbach	Armed Steamship	6,579	United States	Sunk
23 November 1942	Tilawa	Armed cargo-liner	10,006	Merchant Navy	Sunk
3 December 1942	Belita	Fleet oiler	6,323	Norway	Sunk
12 July 1943	Rahmani	Freighter	5,463	Merchant Navy	Sunk

== Sources ==
- Milanovich, Kathrin (2021). "The IJN Submarines of the I 15 Class". In Jordan, John (ed.). Warship 2021. Oxford, UK: Osprey Publishing. pp. 29–43. ISBN 978-1-4728-4779-9.
- Paterson, Lawrence. Hitler's Grey Wolves: U-Boats in the Indian Ocean., Mechanicsburg, PA: Stackpole Books, 2004, ISBN 1-85367-615-2, 287 pgs. Chapter II
