= Japanese seaplane tender Kimikawa Maru =

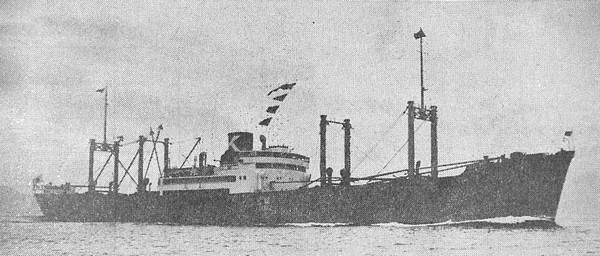
- Kimikawa Maru

History

Empire of Japan
- Name: Kimikawa Maru
- Builder: Kawasaki Shipyards
- Laid down: 2 November 1936
- Launched: 11 March 1937
- Completed: 15 July 1937
- Commissioned: Requisitioned 6 July 1941
- In service: 1937
- Out of service: 1944
- Fate: Sunk on 23 October 1944

General characteristics
- Displacement: 9,687 tons standard
- Length: 146.1 m (479 ft 4 in)
- Beam: 18.97 m (62 ft 3 in)
- Speed: 17 knots (31 km/h; 20 mph)
- Armament: 18 November 1943 76 mm AA guns removed, replaced with 120 mm AA guns. Also had 80 mm AA guns, 2 x 13.2 mm (0.52 in) AA added 15 August 1943
- Aircraft carried: 8 seaplanes

Kimikawa Maru was a seaplane tender of the Imperial Japanese Navy (IJN). The ship was built by the Kawasaki Dockyard Co. at Kobe as a cargo ship for Kawasaki Kisen K. K. line. In July 1941, the ship was taken over by the IJN and converted into an auxiliary seaplane tender. She was able to operate six Aichi E13A "Jake" floatplanes. She operated in northern waters including the capture of Kiska and Attu Island. She was rerated a converted transport (miscellaneous) on 1 October 1943. After conversion, the ship operated in the Philippines and the Dutch East Indies. On 23 October 1944, she was sunk by USS Sawfish in the South China Sea north-northwest of Cape Bojeador, Luzon, the Philippines (18°58′N 118°40′E).
