= Balintang Islands =

Group of islands in the Balintang Channel, Luzon Strait, Philippines

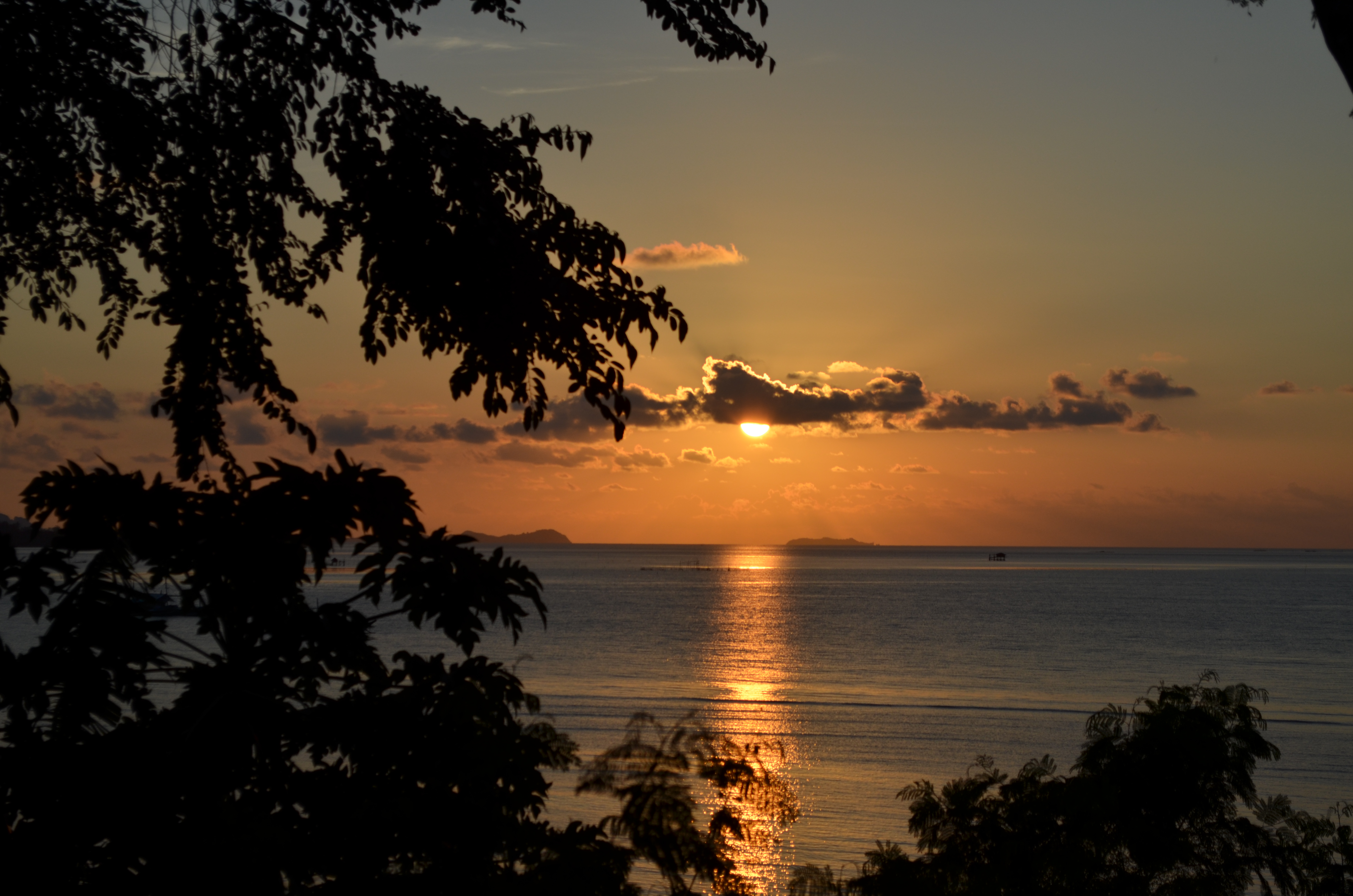

- Location within Philippines

Geography
- Coordinates: 19°57′35″N 122°8′36″E
- Adjacent to: Balintang Channel (South China Sea)
- Total islands: 7
- Major islands: Balintang Island
- Area: 0.35 sq mi (0.91 km^{2})
- Highest elevation: 360 ft (110 m)

Administration
- Philippines
- Region: Cagayan Valley

Demographics
- Population: 0

Additional information

Balintang Islands are a small group of rocky islands in the middle of Balintang Channel, in Luzon Strait, northern Philippines. The islands are almost equidistant to both Babuyan Island, Cagayan, which lies about 29 miles (47 km) to the southwest, and Sabtang Island, Batanes, located 28 miles (45 km) to the northwest. (Note: Websites for both Cagayan and Batanes provinces do not indicate who has jurisdiction of these islands. Distances were measured using Google Earth.) The group is composed of seven small, sharp-peaked islets and rocks visible about 24 miles (39 km) in clear weather. Taiwan is directly to the north of Luzon Island in the Philippines via Luzon Strait to Bashi Channel.

== Islands ==
The westernmost island, Balintang Island, is the largest with about 3/4 mile (1.2 km) in length in a north and south direction. It is much larger than the others with three peaks, the tallest of which is about 360 feet (110 m); a hole is seen through it from southwestward. Three of the other islets lies east, about 1 mile (1.6 km) off its northern point. The other three, about 75 feet (23 m) high, lies about 1/2 mile (0.80 km) off its southeast side. In bad weather, the sea breaks heavily against them. For mariners, they are steep-to and may be passed on either side at a distance of 2 to 3 miles (3.2 to 4.8 km).

== See also ==
- List of islands of the Philippines

== Notes and references ==
Notes
