= SS Tilawa =

Passenger cargo ship sunk during WWII

History

United Kingdom
- Name: Tilawa
- Owner: British India Steam Navigation Company
- Builder: Hawthorn Leslie, Hebburn
- Yard number: 530
- Completed: 1924
- Identification: UK official number 147894; code letters GKLP
- Fate: Torpedoed and sunk, 23 November 1942

General characteristics
- Type: Ocean liner
- Tonnage: 10,006 GRT
- Length: 137.5 m (451 ft 1 in)
- Beam: 18.1 m (59 ft 5 in)
- Decks: 3
- Installed power: 4-cylinder quadruple-expansion steam engine; output: 900 nhp
- Propulsion: Single propeller
- Speed: 12 knots (22 km/h; 14 mph)
- Capacity: 3,290 passengers

SS Tilawa was an ocean liner of the British India Steam Navigation Company launched in 1924. She was sunk during the Second World War while acting as a troopship, targeted by a submarine of the Imperial Japanese Navy in the Indian Ocean on 23 November 1942, with the loss of 280 lives.

The ship carried a cargo of silver bullion that was secretly recovered by a salvage company in 2017. This led to a legal dispute over ownership of the cargo between the salvors and the government of South Africa, the original owner of the silver.

== Design ==
Tilawa was a 10,000-ton steam passenger liner of the British India Steam Navigation Company, built in 1924 by Hawthorn Leslie & Co. Ltd. at Hebburn-on-Tyne. The ship had three decks and a passenger capacity of 3,290, including 60 in first class and 74 in second class.

== Sinking ==
In late November 1942, Tilawa sailed from Ballard Pier in Bombay, bound for Durban followed by Mombasa and Maputo. Acting as a troopship during the Second World War, the ship carried 732 passengers and 222 crew and 600 tons of cargo, including 2,391 bars of silver bullion intended to be struck as South African and Egyptian coinage at the South African mint. The cargo was valued at £35 million ($45 million) in 2024. On 23 November, Tilawa was torpedoed by the submarine I-29 of the Imperial Japanese Navy, near the Seychelles Islands. After the first torpedo hit, the lifeboats were launched; a second torpedo then sank the ship. 280 people went down with it. Survivors spent two days adrift. In the early hours of 25 November, HMS Birmingham, which had been alerted to the sinking, arrived and rescued 678 people. RMS Carthage was sent to search for additional survivors and rescued 4.

== Discovery and salvage ==
In December 2017, Argentum Exploration, a marine salvage company founded by racing driver Ross Hyett and owned by investor Paul Marshall, with the assistance of maritime historian Nigel Pickford, located the wreck of the Tilawa at a depth of approximately 2.5 kilometres (1,400 fathoms; 1.6 mi) and secretly recovered 2,364 (98.9%) of the silver bars. The company declared it to the Receiver of Wreck in the United Kingdom, but South Africa, which had meanwhile signed a contract with a different salvor in ignorance of the successful recovery, asserted legal ownership in 2018 and further denied the obligation to pay a recovery fee because the cargo had been a state possession and being transported for a sovereign, not a commercial purpose. An initial ruling for Argentum by the High Court of Justice was unsuccessfully appealed by South Africa. In May 2024, the Supreme Court of the United Kingdom reversed the ruling, upholding the South African position.

== Legacy ==
Tilawa came to be known as the "Indian Titanic", a reference to the 1912 sinking of Titanic in the Atlantic Ocean with a large loss of life. In 2022, a memorial event took place in Bombay to commemorate the 80th anniversary of Tilawa's loss.
