= USS Rock =

Submarine of the United States

Coordinates: 11°40′N 109°16′E

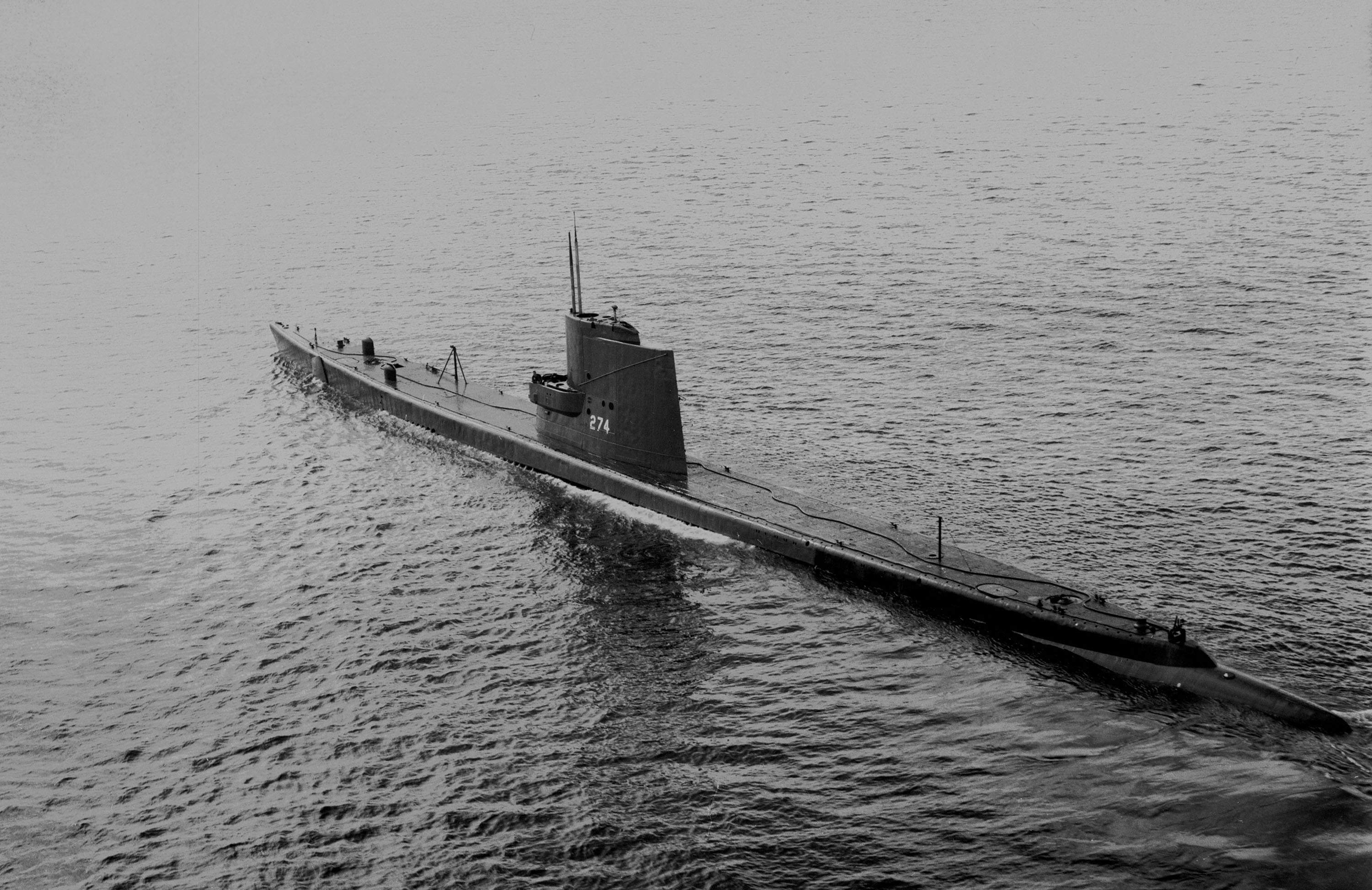
- USS Rock underway, ca. the 1960s.

History

United States
- Builder: Manitowoc Shipbuilding Company, Manitowoc, Wisconsin
- Laid down: 23 December 1942
- Launched: 20 June 1943
- Sponsored by: Mrs. B. O. Wells
- Commissioned: 26 October 1943
- Decommissioned: 1 May 1946
- Recommissioned: 12 October 1953
- Decommissioned: 13 September 1969
- Stricken: 13 September 1969
- Fate: Sold for scrap, 17 August 1972

General characteristics
- Class & type: Gato-class submarine diesel-electric submarine
- Displacement: 1,525 long tons (1,549 t) surfaced; 2,424 long tons (2,463 t) submerged
- Length: 311 ft 9 in (95.02 m)
- Beam: 27 ft 3 in (8.31 m)
- Draft: 17 ft 0 in (5.18 m) maximum
- Propulsion: 4 × General Motors Model 16-248 V16 Diesel engines driving electric generators; 2 × 126-cell Sargo batteries; 4 × high-speed General Electric electric motors with reduction gears; two propellers; 5,400 shp (4.0 MW) surfaced; 2,740 shp (2.0 MW) submerged
- Speed: 21 knots (39 km/h) surfaced; 9 knots (17 km/h) submerged
- Range: 11,000 nautical miles (20,000 km) surfaced at 10 knots (19 km/h)
- Endurance: 48 hours at 2 knots (3.7 km/h) submerged; 75 days on patrol
- Test depth: 300 ft (90 m)
- Complement: 6 officers, 54 enlisted
- Armament: 10 × 21-inch (533 mm) torpedo tubes; 6 forward, 4 aft; 24 torpedoes; 1 × 3-inch (76 mm) / 50 caliber deck gun; Bofors 40 mm and Oerlikon 20 mm cannon

USS Rock (SS/SSR/AGSS-274), a Gato-class submarine, was a ship of the United States Navy named for the rockfish, a striped bass found in the Chesapeake Bay region and elsewhere along the United States East Coast.

== Construction and commissioning ==
Rock was laid down by the Manitowoc Shipbuilding Company at Manitowoc, Wisconsin, on 23 December 1942; launched on 20 June 1943, sponsored by Mrs. B. O. Wells, and commissioned on 26 October 1943.

== Service history ==
=== World War II ===
After a month of intensive training in Lake Michigan, Rock passed through the Chicago Sanitary and Ship Canal (at the time known as the Chicago Drainage Canal) to Lockport, Ill. There she entered a floating drydock for her voyage down the Mississippi River. She arrived in New Orleans on 29 November 1943, and got underway 6 days later for Panama, where she received further training before sailing for Pearl Harbor on 2 January 1944. Following voyage repairs Rock departed from Pearl Harbor for her first war patrol on 8 February 1944.

==== First and second war patrols, February–May 1944 ====
On 29 February 1944, Rock contacted a large enemy convoy en route to Truk. Detected by destroyer Asashimo while making a night surface approach on the convoy, she fired a spread of four torpedoes from her stern tubes at the closing enemy destroyer without scoring. Then illuminated by the destroyer's searchlight, and under fire from the surface ship's 5-inch (130 mm) guns, she dived. For 4 hours she underwent depth charge attacks, but survived. That night she surfaced and found that her periscopes were excessively damaged and that her bridge had been riddled with shrapnel. The damage necessitated a return to Pearl Harbor for repairs. Later that night, the busy Asashimo sank Trout.

Rock began her second war patrol on 4 April 1944, destination Honshū. However, after 34 days in the Bungo Suido and Sagami Wan area without action, she returned to Majuro where she was refitted by Sperry (AS-12).

==== Third war patrol, June–August 1944 ====
Rock, in company with Tilefish and Sawfish, departed Majuro on 22 June 1944, in a coordinated attack group to patrol the Luzon Strait. At dawn on 19 July Rock attacked a Japanese convoy of seven large ships and three escorts, firing 10 torpedoes, six of which exploded. But, as she immediately dove to escape a depth-charge attack, she could not observe their effect.

Two days later Rock contacted another enemy convoy consisting of six large ships and four escorts. She launched four torpedoes, two of which seemed to hit but, again Rock was forced down by depth charges and unable to assess damage to her targets. During the remainder of her time on station, Rock weathered a severe typhoon and witnessed the sinking of Japanese submarine I-29 by Sawfish. On 27 July she headed toward Pearl Harbor.

==== Fourth war patrol, September–November 1944 ====
Rock departed Pearl Harbor on 9 September 1944, en route for the South China Sea for her fourth patrol. On 26 October 1944, she scored three hits on a tanker, Rock's only sinking, Takasago Maru No. 7, accompanied by three escorts. On 27 October 1944, she fired nine torpedoes at Darter, stranded on Bombay Shoal, to prevent her salvage by the Japanese. Three of the torpedoes were hits. This patrol ended when Rock departed the area and sailed for Fremantle, Western Australia, for refit.

==== Fifth and sixth war patrols, December 1944–May 1945 ====
On 14 December 1944, Rock departed Fremantle on her fifth patrol. On 12 January 1945, the U.S. Navy destroyer USS English (DD-696) mistook her for a Japanese sailboat while Rock was on the surface in the South China Sea off Japanese-occupied French Indochina and opened gunfire on her at a range of 9,200 yards (8,400 m). Rock crash-dived to 300 feet (91 m) and sustained no damage. The only other event of note during the 64-day patrol was the rescue of a downed pilot from USS Lexington (CV-16).

At the start of her sixth patrol, which lasted from 7 March to 4 May 1945, she picked up 15 merchant seamen from the SS Peter Silvester, adrift in a life raft for 32 days, and landed them at Exmouth. Continuing northward the next day, Rock was bombed by an aircraft and that night she was struck by a dud torpedo. Neither attack caused any critical damage. In a night attack on 27 March, Rock fired on an enemy destroyer escort without success. On 18 April she joined Tigrone in bombarding Batan Island to leave the Japanese radio station in ruins. Rock then turned toward Saipan to complete a 54-day patrol.

From the Marianas the submarine headed for the United States, arriving at Hunter's Point, San Francisco, 14 May for overhaul. She sailed for Pearl Harbor 7 August 1945, but with the cessation of hostilities on 15 August 1945 was ordered east. She was officially credited with damaging 42,282 gross register tons of enemy shipping during her six war patrols,

=== Post-World War II ===
==== 1945–1946 ====
Rock participated in Navy Day celebrations at New Orleans, then proceeded to New London where she began inactivation in November 1945. She was decommissioned 1 May 1946 and was berthed as a unit of the Atlantic Reserve Fleet.

==== Radar picket submarine (SSR-274), 1953–1959 ====
In early 1951 Rock was towed from New London to the Philadelphia Naval Shipyard, where she was converted to a radar picket submarine by bisecting her at the forward bulkhead of the control room and inserting a 30-foot (9 m) section between the control room and the forward battery to house the new CIC and the majority of her new electronic equipment. Reclassified SSR-274 on 18 July 1952, Rock recommissioned at Philadelphia, Pennsylvania, on 12 October 1953.

After a short period of training with Submarine Squadron 6 off the Virginia Capes, she proceeded to San Diego to join Submarine Squadron 5. On 23 July 1954, she departed San Diego for the western Pacific area and a six-month tour on the Taiwan Strait Patrol. She subsequently alternated deployments to the western Pacific with operations off the United States West Coast. She made six-month deployments to the western Pacific in 1956 and during the winter of 1958–1959.

==== Auxiliary general submarine (AGSS-274), 1959–1969 ====
By 31 December 1959 there no longer existed an operational requirement for a radar picket submarine in the fleet, and on that date the Air Control Center was decommissioned and Rock was redesignated an "auxiliary general submarine," AGSS-274,. Following operations off the U.S. West Coast and another overhaul, Rock again deployed to the western Pacific in November 1961. She made subsequent six-month deployments to the western Pacific in 1963, 1965, 1966–1967, and 1968.

Operating in the eastern Pacific during the first half of 1969, Rock departed San Diego 11 July and conducted operations in support of fleet training in the Hawaiian operating areas until proceeding on 16 August 1959 to the U.S. West Coast.

== Decommissioning and disposal ==
On 13 September 1969, Rock decommissioned at Mare Island Naval Shipyard. Struck from the Navy List on the same day, she was designated for use as a target to destruction. She was sold for scrap on 17 August 1972

== Awards ==
- Asiatic-Pacific Campaign Medal with four battle stars
- World War II Victory Medal
- China Service Medal
- National Defense Service Medal with star
- Vietnam Service Medal with three battle stars for Vietnam War service
