= USS Sawfish =

Submarine of the United States

USS Sawfish (SS-276)
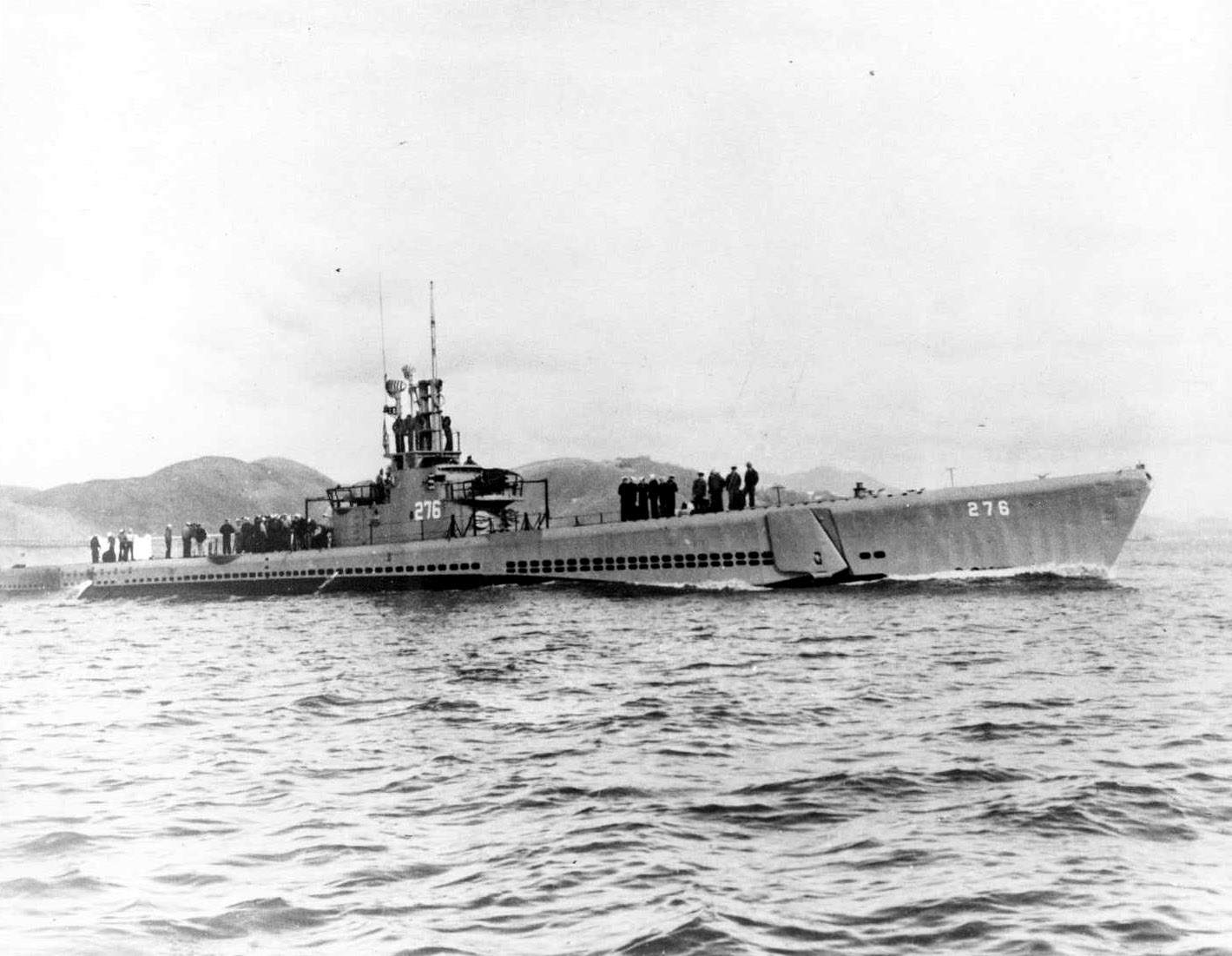
- USS Sawfish (SS-276), probably off Hunter's Point Shipyard near San Francisco, California, following an overhaul in late 1943–early 1944

History

United States
- Name: Sawfish
- Namesake: Sawfish
- Builder: Portsmouth Naval Shipyard, Kittery, Maine
- Laid down: 20 January 1942
- Launched: 23 June 1942
- Sponsored by: Hattie Wyatt Caraway
- Commissioned: 26 August 1942
- Decommissioned: 20 June 1946
- Stricken: 1 April 1960
- Fate: Sold for scrap, 2 December 1960

General characteristics
- Class & type: Gato-class diesel-electric submarine
- Displacement: 1,525 tons (1,549 t) surfaced; 2,424 tons (2,460 t) submerged
- Length: 311 ft 9 in (95.02 m)
- Beam: 27 ft 3 in (8.31 m)
- Draft: 17 ft 0 in (5.18 m) maximum
- Propulsion: 4 × Fairbanks-Morse Model 38D8-⅛ 9-cylinder opposed piston diesel engines driving electrical generators; 2 × 126-cell Sargo batteries; 4 × high-speed General Electric electric motors with reduction gears; two propellers; 5,400 shp (4.0 MW) surfaced; 2,740 shp (2.0 MW) submerged
- Speed: 21 knots (39 km/h) surfaced; 9 knots (17 km/h) submerged
- Range: 11,000 NM (20,000 km) surfaced at 10 knots (19 km/h)
- Endurance: 48 hours at 2 knots (3.7 km/h) submerged; 75 days on patrol
- Test depth: 300 ft (90 m)
- Complement: 6 officers, 54 enlisted
- Armament: 10 × 21-inch (533 mm) torpedo tubes; 6 forward, 4 aft; 24 torpedoes; 1 × 3-inch (76 mm) / 50 caliber deck gun; Bofors 40 mm and Oerlikon 20 mm cannon

USS Sawfish (SS-276), a Gato-class submarine, was a ship of the United States Navy named for the sawfish, a viviparous ray, which has a long, flat snout with a row of tooth-like structures along each edge. It is found principally in the mouths of tropical American and African rivers.

== Construction and commissioning ==
Sawfish was laid down on 20 January 1942 by the Portsmouth Navy Yard at Kittery, Maine; launched on 23 June 1942; sponsored by Hattie Wyatt Caraway, the first woman to be elected to the United States Senate; and commissioned on 26 August 1942.

== Service history ==
=== World War II ===
After shakedown off Portsmouth, New Hampshire, in Narragansett Bay, and en route to the Panama Canal, Sawfish arrived at Pearl Harbor, Hawaii, on 21 January 1943. Ten days later, she got underway for the first of her 10 war patrols.

==== First and second war patrols, January–June 1943 ====
Sawfish proceeded to waters off southwestern Japan, where she attacked several targets and concluded that she had sunk or damaged some. She turned out, though, to have mistakenly sunk two neutral Soviet cargo ships on the Pacific Route, Kola on 16 February 1943 and Ilmen on 17 February. A careful study of Japanese and American records after the war did not confirm any other sinkings on Sawfish's first war patrol, which ended when she reached Midway Atoll in the Northwestern Hawaiian Islands on 25 March 1943.

The submarine departed Midway on 15 April and headed for Japan. On 5 May off the coast of Honshū, she sank the converted gunboat, Hakkai Maru. A fortnight later, she stalked an enemy task force, but lost her quarry in heavy swells. She returned to Pearl Harbor on 6 June.

==== Third war patrol, June–August 1943 ====
Underway again on the last day of the month, Sawfish set course for the East China Sea. On the night of 21 July, she attacked convoy Hi-3 of nine ships and concluded that she had scored several hits. However, postwar assessment of records was unable to confirm any kills during this attack or during her operations for the next five days.

Finally, early on the morning of 27 July, her luck changed when she attacked a convoy escorted by a 720-ton minelayer. Comdr. Sands fired a spread of four torpedoes from a range of only 750 yards (690 m). He went deep as soon as the "fish" were clear, and in less than half a minute, the submarine was jolted by a violent explosion. Fearing that the detonation had been premature, Sands remained deep for over an hour. When he ascended to periscope depth, the convoy had escaped, but the escort, coastal minelayer Hirashima, was sinking. Sawfish returned to Pearl Harbor on 10 August.

==== Fourth and fifth war patrols, September–December 1943 ====
During her fourth patrol, 10 September to 16 October, defective torpedoes frustrated the seven attacks she had made in the Sea of Japan before she returned to Midway. She got underway for the Bonins and her fifth patrol on 1 November. On 8 December, she sank 3,267-ton passenger-cargo ship Sansei Maru and returned to Midway on 19 December. She soon proceeded to Hunter's Point Navy Yard, San Francisco, California, for overhaul.

==== Sixth and seventh war patrols, April–August 1944 ====
Back in top trim, the submarine returned to Pearl Harbor early in the spring. On 8 April 1944, she got underway for Japanese waters and her sixth war patrol. However, she only encountered two targets, a cargo ship that she attacked on 25 April and a second vessel that she sighted four days later—too fast and too far away for the submarine to attack. Although the submarine reported scoring two hits on the cargo ship, Japanese records contain no evidence of any sinking in the vicinity of the attack.

During her seventh war patrol, Sawfish joined Rock and Tilefish for wolfpack operations. The submarines sortied from Majuro on 22 June and headed for the Philippines. On 18 July, she damaged a tanker and on 26 July fired a spread of four torpedoes at surfaced Japanese submarine I-29 (one of only six Axis powers submarines to attempt transoceanic Yanagi missions), which exploded and sank. After a fruitless chase of a large Japanese convoy, the wolfpack ended the patrol at Pearl Harbor on 15 August.

==== Eighth war patrol, September–November 1944 ====
During Sawfish's eighth war patrol, her commanding officer, Comdr. Alan B. Banister, led a wolfpack, which included Drum, Icefish, and from time-to-time other submarines. The pack departed Pearl Harbor on 9 September and headed for waters south of Formosa, where the submarines took a heavy toll on enemy shipping. Sawfish herself accounted for a 6,521-ton tanker, Tachibana Maru, on 9 October and a 6,838-ton seaplane tender, Kimikawa Maru, on 23 October.

During the patrol, Sawfish also served on lifeguard station off Formosa in support of carrier raids. On 16 October, she rescued a pilot from VF-15 of USS Essex), who had survived four and one-half days at sea in a small rubber boat without food, water, or sunshade. The wolfpack returned to Majuro on 8 November.

==== Ninth and tenth war patrols, December 1944–April 1945 ====
Sawfish got underway on 17 December 1944 and returned to waters off Formosa, where she spent her entire ninth war patrol on lifeguard station. She rescued a pilot on 21 January 1945 before heading toward Guam. She reached Apra Harbor on 4 February for refit.

Sawfish sailed on 10 March for her 10th and last war patrol, which she spent on lifeguard station off Nansei Shoto supporting air strikes preparing for and covering the conquest of Okinawa. She returned to Pearl Harbor on 26 April and soon proceeded to San Francisco for overhaul in the Bethlehem Steel Company yard there.

=== After World War II ===
Sawfish was heading toward Hawaii on 15 August 1945 when hostilities ended. She reached Pearl Harbor on 22 August, but soon headed back to the West Coast for duty as a training ship for the West Coast Fleet Sound School. She returned to Hawaii early in 1946, but was back at San Francisco on 22 March for inactivation. She was decommissioned on 26 June 1946 and remained in reserve at Mare Island Naval Shipyard until May 1947, when she proceeded to the naval base at Terminal Island, Los Angeles, for duty as a Naval Reserve training ship. On 1 April 1960, Sawfish was stricken from the Navy List and scrapped.

== Honors and awards ==
Sawfish received eight battle stars for service during World War II.

== In popular culture ==
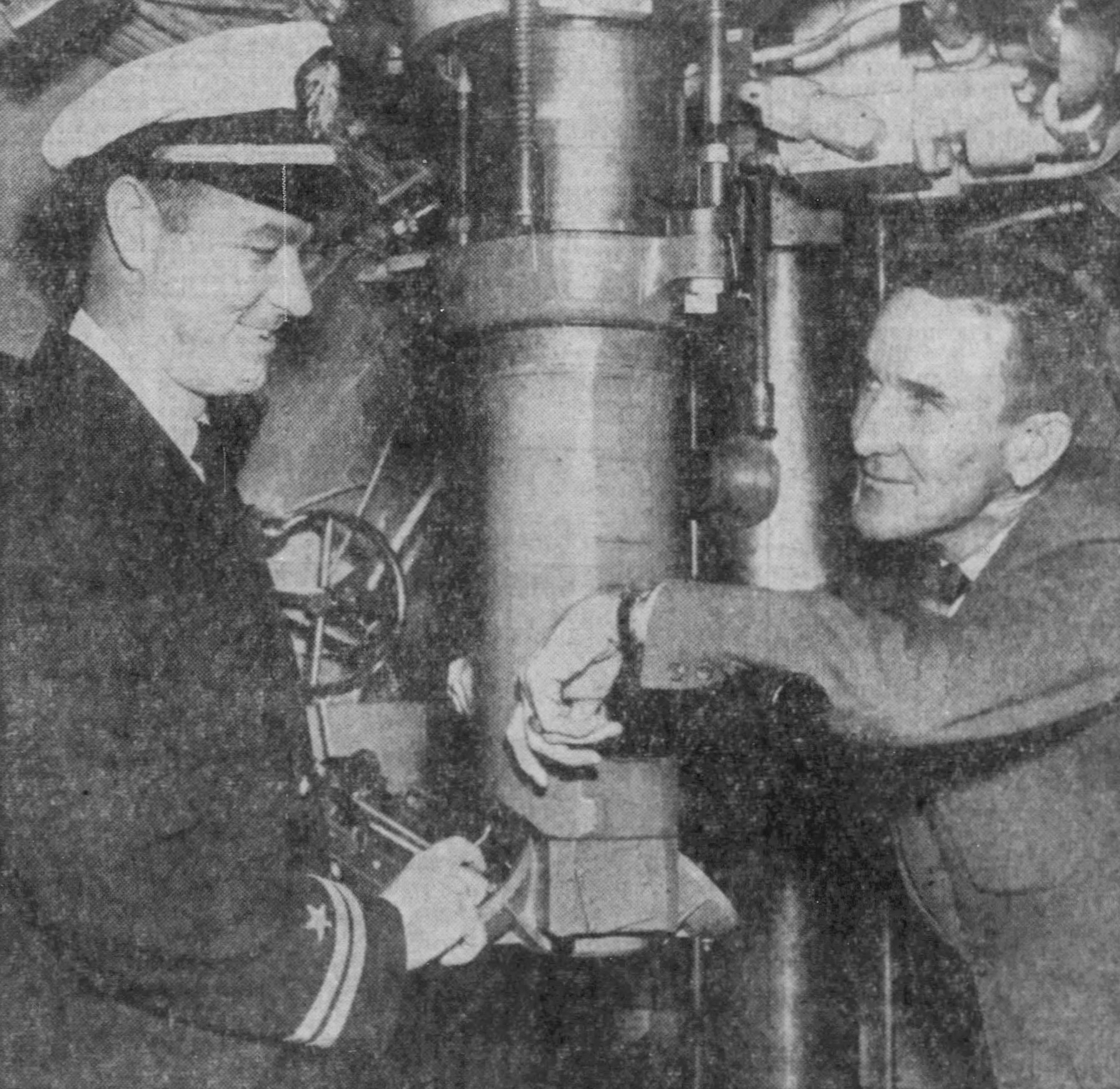
Commanding officer Lieutenant John Gullet and retired Rear Admiral Thomas M. Dykers onboard Sawfish during the filming of the TV series The Silent Service in 1957

Thanks in large part to Terminal Island's proximity to Hollywood, Sawfish enjoyed an extensive television career in the 1950s. The submarine was used as a filming location for TV specials, such as The Pharmacist's Mate (1951), The Making of a Submariner (1955), City at Night (1956), Stand by to Dive (1956), and the "Solar Sub" episode of Adventures of Tom Swift (1959). Sawfish's most prominent role was as the primary filming location for the 1957 NBC TV series The Silent Service, where Sawfish portrayed numerous other submarines across the show's 78 episodes. Sawfish's final role was as the fictional submarine USS Moray in the Season 3 Episode 23 episode of Perry Mason, "The Case of the Slandered Submarine" (1960).

The name "USS Sawfish" was also used for a fictional nuclear-powered submarine in the 1959 film On the Beach, where she was portrayed by HMS Andrew, a Royal Navy diesel-electric submarine.
