= USS Tilefish =

Submarine of the United States

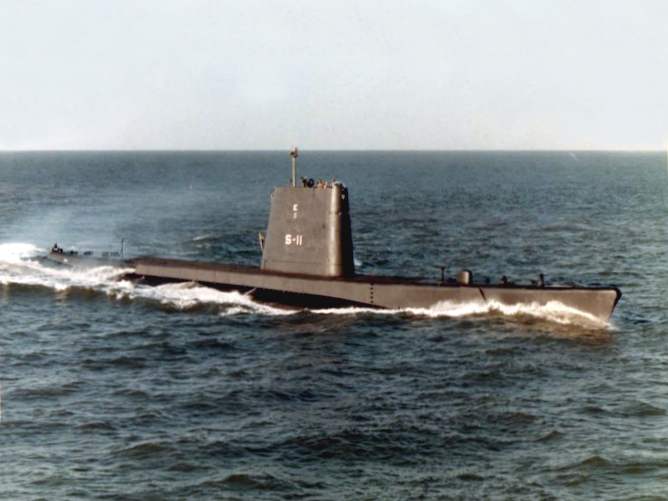

History

United States
- Name: USS Tilefish (SS-307)
- Builder: Mare Island Naval Shipyard
- Laid down: 10 March 1943
- Launched: 25 October 1943
- Commissioned: 15 December 1943
- Decommissioned: 4 May 1960
- Stricken: 1 December 1960
- Fate: Transferred to Venezuela, 4 May 1960

Venezuela
- Name: ARV Carite (S-11)
- Acquired: 4 May 1960
- Decommissioned: 28 January 1977
- Fate: Cannibalized for spare parts

General characteristics
- Class & type: Balao-class diesel-electric submarine
- Displacement: 1,526 tons (1,550 t) surfaced; 2,424 tons (2,460 t) submerged
- Length: 311 ft 10 in (95.05 m)
- Beam: 27 ft 4 in (8.33 m)
- Draft: 16 ft 10 in (5.13 m) maximum
- Propulsion: 4 × Fairbanks-Morse Model 38D8-1/8 9-cylinder opposed-piston diesel engines driving electrical generators; 2 × 126-cell Sargo batteries; 4 × high-speed Elliott electric motors with reduction gears; 2 × propellers; 5,400 shp (4.0 MW) surfaced; 2,740 shp (2.04 MW) submerged
- Speed: 20.25 knots (37 km/h) surfaced; 8.75 knots (16.21 km/h) submerged
- Range: 11,000 nautical miles (20,000 km) surfaced at 10 knots (19 km/h)
- Endurance: 48 hours at 2 knots (3.7 km/h) submerged; 75 days on patrol
- Test depth: 400 feet (120 m)
- Complement: 10 officers, 70–71 enlisted
- Armament: 10 × 21-inch (533 mm) torpedo tubes; 6 forward, 4 aft; 24 torpedoes; 1 × 5-inch (127 mm) / 25 caliber deck gun; Bofors 40 mm and Oerlikon 20 mm cannon

USS Tilefish (SS-307), a Balao-class submarine, was the only ship of the United States Navy to be named for the tilefish, a large, yellow-spotted deepwater food fish.

Her keel was laid down on 10 March 1943 at Vallejo, California, by the Mare Island Navy Yard. She was launched on 25 October 1943 sponsored by Mrs. Wilson D. Leggett, and commissioned on 28 December 1943.

== First and second war patrols ==
During February and March 1944, Tilefish underwent trials and shakedown off the California coast before getting underway for Hawaii. On 3 April, the submarine departed Pearl Harbor for her first war patrol, setting course for the Japanese home islands. While patrolling in the "Hit Parade" area east of Honshū, Tilefish sighted many enemy aircraft but found few targets for her torpedoes. Early in the patrol, she was hampered by the failure of her fathometer; and, throughout the mission, she was plagued by periscope fogging and overcast weather which ruled out celestial navigation. Finally, on the morning of 11 May, the novice submarine and her crew encountered their first opportunity for action. Tilefish sighted a small convoy and launched a determined attack. Choosing a passenger liner as her target, the submarine unleashed a spread of torpedoes, scoring a hit under the ship's bridge. As Tilefish dove amid the sounds of explosions, she experienced problems which caused her inadvertently to take on a large amount of water. Before the situation was brought under control, Tilefish had made a hair-raising dive to 580 feet (180 m), well below test depth. Too deep to be reached by the depth charges of her pursuers, she evaded their attack and continued her patrol.

The son of a Tilefish crew member recalls from his childhood hearing a detailed account of this initial engagement:

"My father, Motor Machinists Mate 2nd Class George Oberhofer, found himself in the thick of things during Tilefish's first attack. At the time the target was sighted, repairs to the submarine's ballast system were underway in her compressor compartment, with one disassembled pipe leaving the compartment in open communication with the sea. As a result, the compartment began to flood during the attack dive. Had the water level reached the electrical compressor motors, they would have shorted out, leaving her able to surface once but unable to dive again, a sitting duck for enemy destroyers.

"MM2C Oberhofer dove into the flooding compartment to the offending pipe and managed to close it off and get the compartment pumped out before the compressor motors were damaged. For these actions he was awarded a silver star, rare in the submarine service where unit commendations for collective performance were the more typical way to recognize valor in combat.

"My father kept a curious memento from the TIlefish, a tank watch in which the hands had become detached and floated freely around under the crystal. I asked what had happened to his watch and he replied, 'Depth charges.' This may shed light on events after the initial attack run. We may reasonably speculate that Tilefish was under heavy depth charging by Japanese destroyers after sinking her target, and was diving to extreme depths in search of a thermocline—a layer of water of a sharply different temperature than the water above it. Thermoclines reflect sonar pings, rendering a submarine that dives below one invisible. It seems likely that Tilefish successfully found one at 580 feet and slipped away because of it."

Finding further contact with the enemy to be very light, Tilefish requested another patrol area and was assigned to the northern Mariana Islands where she searched for targets on 19 and 20 May. She completed this patrol at Majuro on 29 May 1944.

After a refitting by submarine tender Bushnell (AS-15), Tilefish departed Majuro on 22 June 1944 and headed with an attack group for the Luzon Strait area. In company with submarines Sawfish (SS-276) and Rock (SS-274), Tilefish set course, via Batan Island and Bashi Channel, for her assigned position. On the morning of 18 July, Tilefish launched a torpedo attack on a large convoy Hi-69 and had the satisfaction of seeing a freighter sustain two hits. Meanwhile, Rock had joined in the attack and was being held down by a destroyer of the convoy's screen. At 10:50, Tilefish made a torpedo attack on the destroyer. Seeing their wakes, the enemy ship attempted to evade the torpedoes, but the first hit under its forward mount and wrapped her bow around the bridge. A second hit added to the destroyer's damage. Before Tilefish was forced down by enemy aircraft, she caught one last glimpse of the destroyer, listing and dead in the water. Nine minutes later, the submarine made a periscope sweep and found no sign of the enemy ship. The enemy ship, frigate CD-17, survived her damage, however.

In the days that followed, the submarine patrolled the waters east of Formosa attempting to intercept the convoy which she had damaged on 18 July. On 26 July, Tilefish surfaced just at the moment when Sawfish launched a three-torpedo attack on Japanese submarine I-29 (one of only six Axis powers submarines to attempt trans-oceanic Yanagi missions), which exploded, leaving behind only smoke and flames. On 31 July, after Sawfish had reported a convoy contact off Luzon, Tilefish set course to intercept the enemy ships but never found the quarry. Tilefish fueled at Midway Island before completing her second patrol at Pearl Harbor on 15 August.

== Third and fourth war patrols ==
Tilefish departed Oahu on 10 September 1944. This patrol, conducted in the Sea of Okhotsk and off the Kuril Islands, was made difficult by rough seas which produced swells reaching heights of 30 to 40 feet (9 to 12 m). Despite the problems imposed by high seas, Tilefish sank a small trawler with her four-inch (102 mm) gun on 23 September. On 3 October, she destroyed two small cargo vessels as they were leaving Hitokappu Bay of Iturup. On 6 October, Tilefish claimed two more kills—a cargo ship and a wooden-hulled antisubmarine vessel.During the mid-watch on 13 October, an adventurous owl came on board. The feathered seafarer was promptly dubbed Boris Hootski and made official ship's mascot. On 16 October she sank the Japanese guard boat Kyowa Maru No.2 (108 GRT) On 17 October, to prevent its being salvaged, she blew out the stern of a vessel grounded west of Japan's Shimushiru Island (today the Russian island Simushir). Tilefish ended her third patrol at Midway Island on 24 October 1944.

On 15 November, Tilefish got underway for the Kuril Islands. During the first half of this patrol, she operated in northern waters but was hampered by bitterly cold weather, poor visibility, and hurricane-force winds. The mountainous waves forced the submarine to submerge to ride out the storm. On 25 November, Tilefish entered the Sea of Okhotsk to patrol the coast of Shimushiru Island. Snow frosted the periscope and prevented accurate identification of possible targets. By 16 December, Tilefish had moved south to take up a lifeguard station off Najima Saki. On the morning of 22 December, she sank Chidori, a torpedo boat [758 tons], and evaded a Japanese counterattack of depth charges and aerial bombs without damage. She departed the patrol area on 24 December and arrived at Pearl Harbor on 2 January 1945.

== Fifth and sixth war patrols ==
After refitting by submarine tender Orion (AS-18), Tilefish set course for the Mariana Islands in company with submarines Thresher (SS-200) and Peto (SS-265) on 31 January 1945, under the command of Lt. Cmdr. Walter F. Schlech, Jr. En route, she participated in exercises and searched for the survivors of a downed American plane. Underway from Saipan on 13 February, Tilefish proceeded independently to her patrol area in the Nansei Shoto where she prowled the traffic lanes in search of targets. She reported sinking a 90-ton cargo ship (Sampan)[?]in a morning gun attack on 28 February before taking up a lifeguard station in support of planned strikes on Amami Shima. On 1 March, she rescued a flier from aircraft carrier Hancock (CV-19) whose plane had splashed and sank only 500 yards off the starboard bow of the submarine. On 4 March She sent a fishing trawler "Shiko Maru" to the bottom off Setsuko Saki, 28°15'N, 129°08'E. On the following day, in the course of a day-long attack on the 2812 ton freighter "Hangzhou Maru" (evaded attacks), she sank a Japanese minesweeper (W 15 500 tons)) which was escorting the cargo ship [W 15 was run aground but was a total loss].. From 10 March to 19 March, she performed lifeguard duties in support of strikes on Nagoya and other Japanese targets. After patrolling the approaches to Tokyo Bay on 22 March, Tilefish set course, via Midway Island and Pearl Harbor, for San Francisco, California where she was overhauled.

Tilefish returned to Pearl Harbor on 11 July and was soon underway for Midway Island and Saipan. When the war in the Pacific ended, Tilefish was on lifeguard station off the Ryukyu Islands. She continued lifeguard duties and patrols in the western Pacific until 7 September when she returned to Pearl Harbor. Early in 1946, Tilefish returned to San Francisco, California, and operated off the West Coast throughout most of the year. In May, she participated in "wolfpack" exercises and in September took part in live load training, using the hulk of the former SS Schuyler Colfax as a target. In October, she made a brief trip to the Hawaiian Islands and then returned to the West Coast. From January 1947 to September 1950, Tilefish continued to operate out of California ports with occasional voyages to Pearl Harbor. During this period, she conducted underway training and took part in fleet exercises off the West Coast.

== Post World War II service ==
On 5 September 1950, Tilefish departed Pearl Harbor for Japan. From 28 September 1950 through 24 March 1951, the submarine operated out of Japanese ports conducting patrols in Korean waters in support of the United Nations campaign in Korea. She made reconnaissance patrols of La Perouse Strait to keep the Commander, Naval Forces Far East, informed of Soviet seaborne activity in that area. After this tour, the submarine resumed her routine of operations out of Hawaiian and West Coast ports until 1957. Highlights of this period were convoy attack exercises in Hawaiian waters and a goodwill visit to Acapulco, Mexico, early in June 1956.

Following a period of reduced status and overhaul, Tilefish again got underway in April 1957 for Far Eastern waters. During this deployment, she visited ports in Japan and the Ryukyu Islands before completing the cruise at San Diego, California, on 27 September 1957.

On 16 September 1958, the veteran submarine made way via Pearl Harbor for Midway Island and the Marshall Islands. With four civilian geophysicists on board from the Hydrographic Office, the submarine completed a submerged survey of Eniwetok, Wake, and Midway Island, operating at sea for nearly three months. She returned to San Diego, California, on 5 December 1958 for inactivation.

Tilefish was decommissioned on 12 October 1959, underwent overhaul at the San Francisco Naval Shipyard, and was recommissioned on 30 January 1960. Her final decommissioning was in May 1960. She was struck from the Naval Vessel Register on 1 December 1960, and sold to the Venezuelan government.

== ARV Carite (S-11) ==
The ex-Tilefish, now commissioned as ARV Carite (S-11), served in the Armada Venezolana (the Venezuelan Navy) for 16 years. In 1969 and 1970, she played the part of a German U-boat hiding in the Orinoco River during the filming of the movie Murphy's War. For the role, she was modified by the addition of a "cigarette deck" aft of her sail and was painted in a "dazzle" camouflage pattern.

Carite was decommissioned by the Venezuelan Navy on 28 January 1977 and cannibalized for spare parts.

== Awards ==
Tilefish received five battle stars for World War II service. She received one battle star for Korean War service.
