= Fuerza de San José =

Coordinates: 12°56′48″N 122°05′46″E

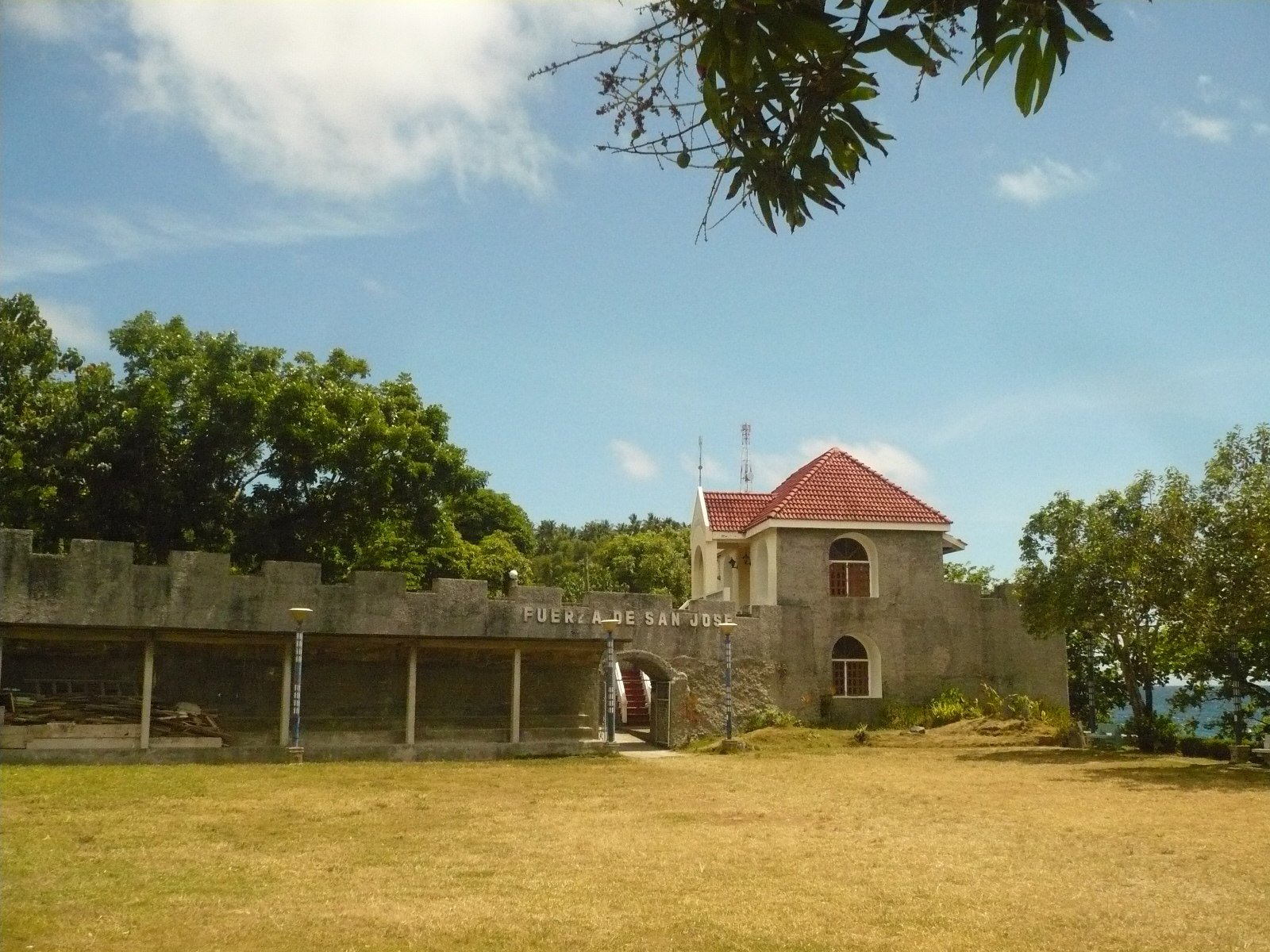
View of the main entrance of Fuerza de San José.

Fuerza de San José is a 17th-century Spanish fortification located in the municipality of Banton, on the homonymous island, in Romblon, Philippines. Together with Fuerza de San Andrés and Fuerza de Santiago, it is part of the ancient fortification system of the Sibuyan Sea islands, built under the command of Agustín de San Pedro in order to defend the locals from the attacks that devastated the coasts of the archipelago, especially Moorish incursions from the southern islands. Considered by locals a symbol of greatness and resistance, it played a fundamental role in the defense of Banton in the first decades of Spanish rule of the region, and witnessed numerous battles.

The fort received the historical marker on behalf of the National Historical Commission of the Philippines in 2022, after the town's City Hall resolved to build a park on the site, which could put the integrity of the structure at risk. The national committee's decision froze the development plans, although due to the COVID-19 pandemic and other circumstances, official signage has not yet been carried out. Nevertheless, the fort is included in the list of protected buildings under article 3 of the 2009 National Cultural Heritage Law.

== Historic context ==
After the arrival of Spanish settlers on Banton in the early 1600s, they founded a small village southwest of the current urban center's location, being in fact the first settlement in the archipelago and current province of Romblon to be formally established (although their arrival at Romblon, further south, occurred already in 1569, led by Martín de Goiti). Due to this, all the settlements that followed in the region were at the time under the jurisdiction of Banton, which was part of the province of Capiz, up to 1631, when the village (and present municipality) of Romblon was founded.

In 1622, local administration was transferred to Augustinian friars who had arrived from the Visayas, who immediately set to establish local missions, which, beyond their religious purpose of evangelism, were meant to organise the local population, both native and Spanish, in order to defend themselves from Moorish incursions from southern Mindanao (who had declared war on the Spanish Crown back in 1565 and were operating mainly from Sultan Kudarat). In fact, according to historical records of the Augustinian Recollects, immediately after the missionaries arrived on the small island, violent assaults occurred which greatly hindered the evangelization process of the first Augustinian mission in the region. The head of the mission, Pedro de San José, had to flee and find refuge in the inland mountains.

When the superior of the order, Juan de San Antonio, learned of the serious situation, he presented the Spanish military command with fortification plans of the islands and sent for friar Agustín de San Pedro, nicknamed El Padre Capitán (Father Captain), who had gained fame for his war exploits against the Moors and Muslim raiders in Mindanao, and asked him to take charge of the Romblon mission. Upon arrival, San Pedro assumed leadership of the local Augustinians and immediately began construction of several defences, including two fortified churches on both islands, built in the 1640s. The church at Banton was completed in 1645, and three years later it was baptized as the Parish Church of San Nicolás de Tolentino (after the new patron saint of the municipality). Due to the urgency of the moment, its construction focused less on architectural design and more on functionality, so that it would resist raids. That same year, the provincial encomienda system, administered from Arevalo, was dismantled, establishing the political-military province of Romblon, to which the island of Banton would also belong.

== The fortification ==
At the moments of its construction, the main purpose of Fuerza de San José was to offer protection to the church and its convent, which Agustín de San Pedro surrounded with a defensive wall with watchtowers in each of its corners. Inside the fort, a well was dug for independent water supply and other facilities were built for the needs of evacuees in case of a Muslim incursion. To the north of the church, a tower was built on top of the hill overlooking much of the Sibuyan Sea, the island's port (including Matagar Point, an arrowhead-shaped rock formation that served as an orientation point), and the route to and from the south of the archipelago. The fort was named Fuerza de San José in honor of Saint Joseph, defender of Christ and protector of the Church.

The fort is isosceles triangle-shaped. Its 4.58 m high, 11.17 m long and 2.08 m thick walls were more than sufficient for the twelve cannons of different calibers positioned on top of them. During its construction, blocks of coral stone (abundant in the region) were used together with lime mortar, using precision techniques that gave the structure the necessary robustness. Like the forts on the island of Romblon, the walls were equipped with features somewhat unique for the time, such as embrasures for the cannons.

In the Memoir of Panay, from 1870, there is a story about a fleet which sailed from the southern island of Jolo (under Moorish rule) to assault the island of Banton. On their way, the pirates tried to steer clear of the coasts of Banton and Romblon to avoid a confrontation with Agustín San Pedro, whom they called "the combatant priest." However, upon docking in the shallow waters off the coast of Banton, the Augustinian ordered eight of the karakoas to be set on fire, scaring away the rest of the boats. According to the story, since then, Muslim piracy on the island was practically eradicated.

In Philippine historiography, the story of Fuerza San José, more than a narrative of a Hispanic mission, is the story of the initiative and courage of the island's population. In his book "Historical Synopsis of the Order of Augustinian Recollects of the Province of S. Nicolas de Tolentino of the Philippine Islands", Filipino priest and historian Licinio Ruiz writes: «Due to its location and the work of "Father Captain", the fortress of Banton is a true bastion; it would be difficult to find another fortress in the archipelago in which so much effort has been invested... The inhabitants themselves are simple people, actively dedicated to their native city and on occasions, whether in defense against the Moors or against thieves, they always show signs of bravery".
