= Banton, Romblon =

Municipality in Romblon, Philippines

Banton Jones
- Municipality
- Municipality of Banton
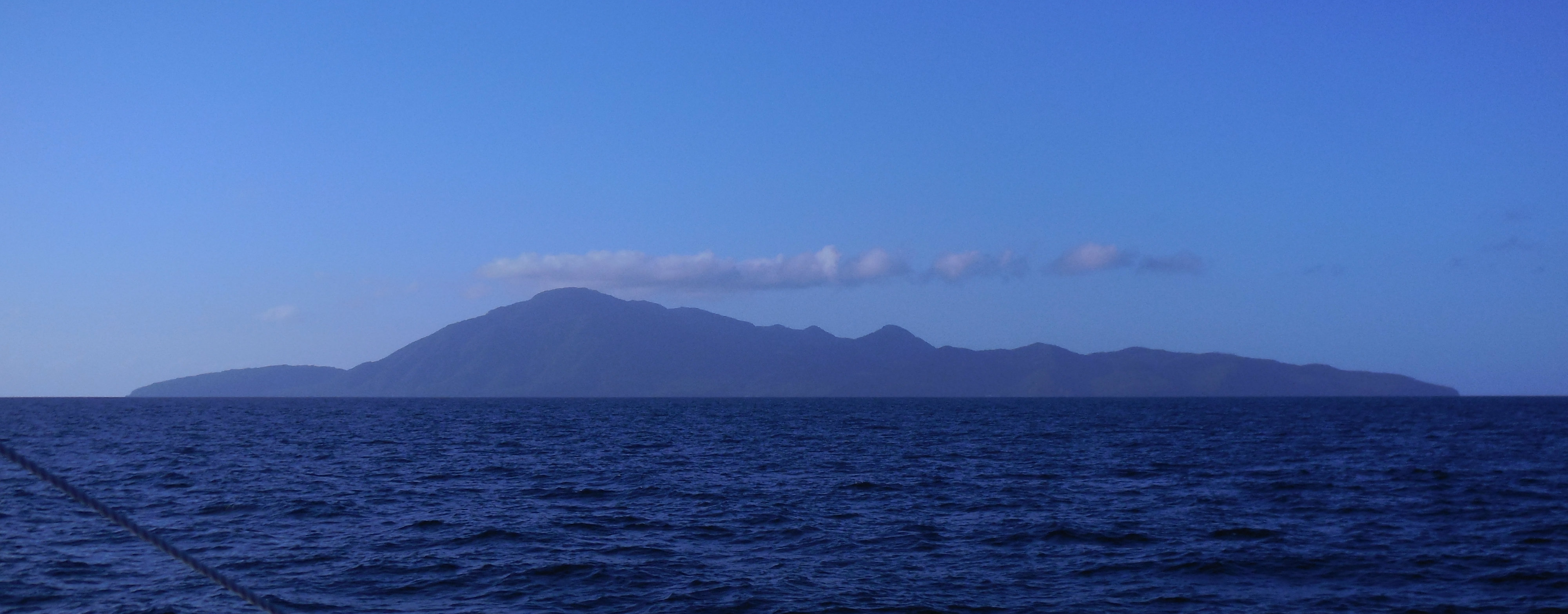
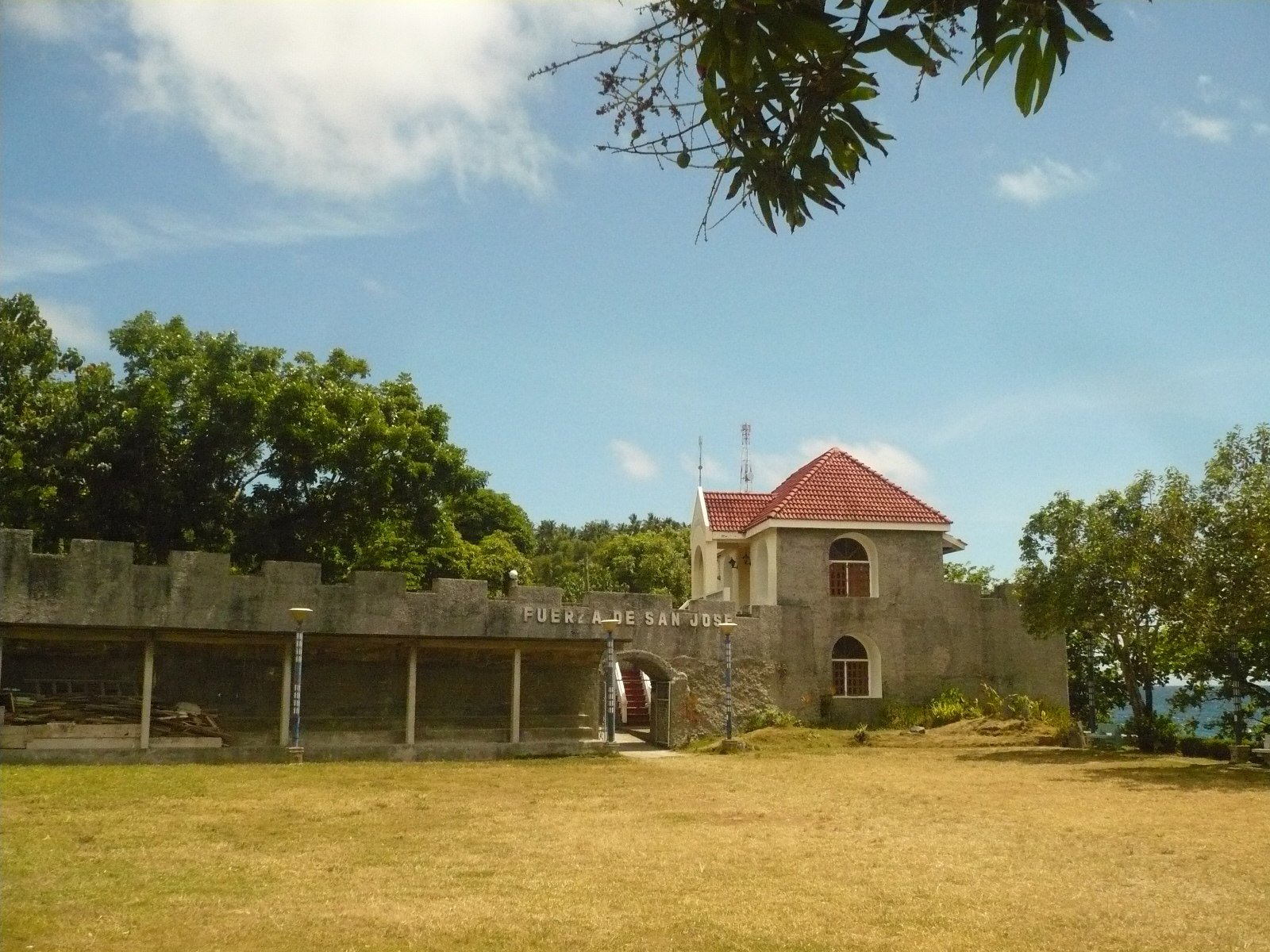
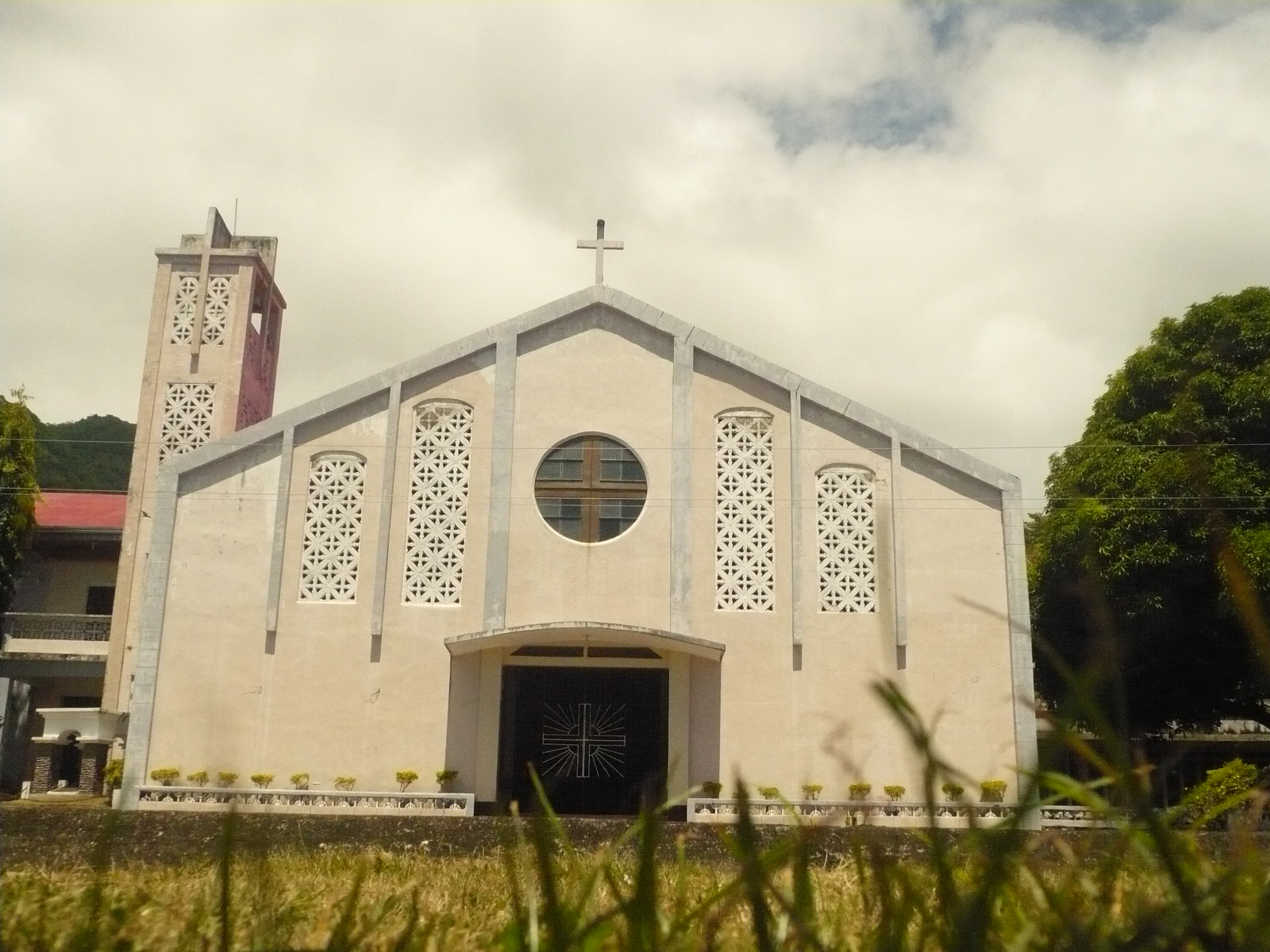
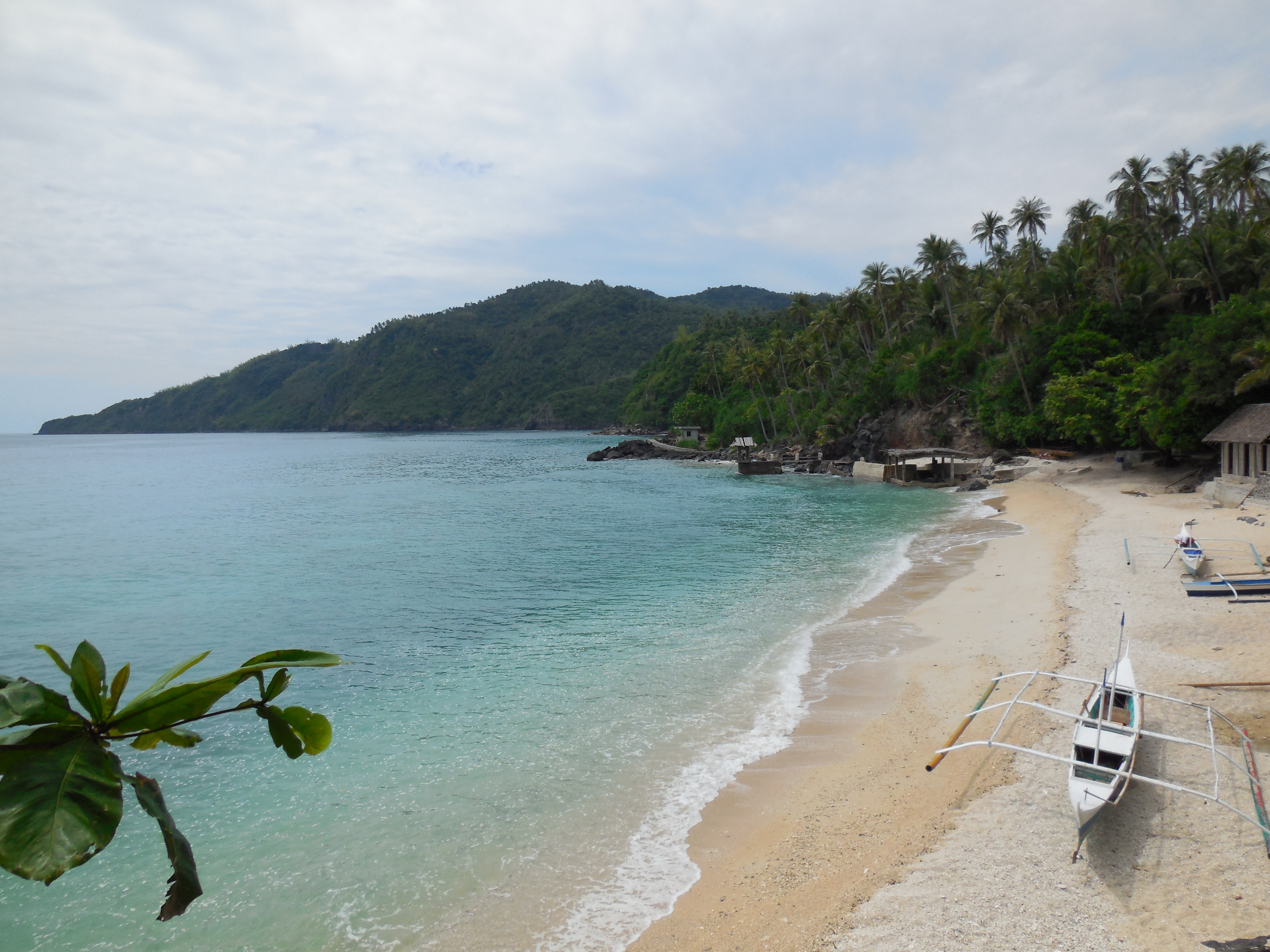
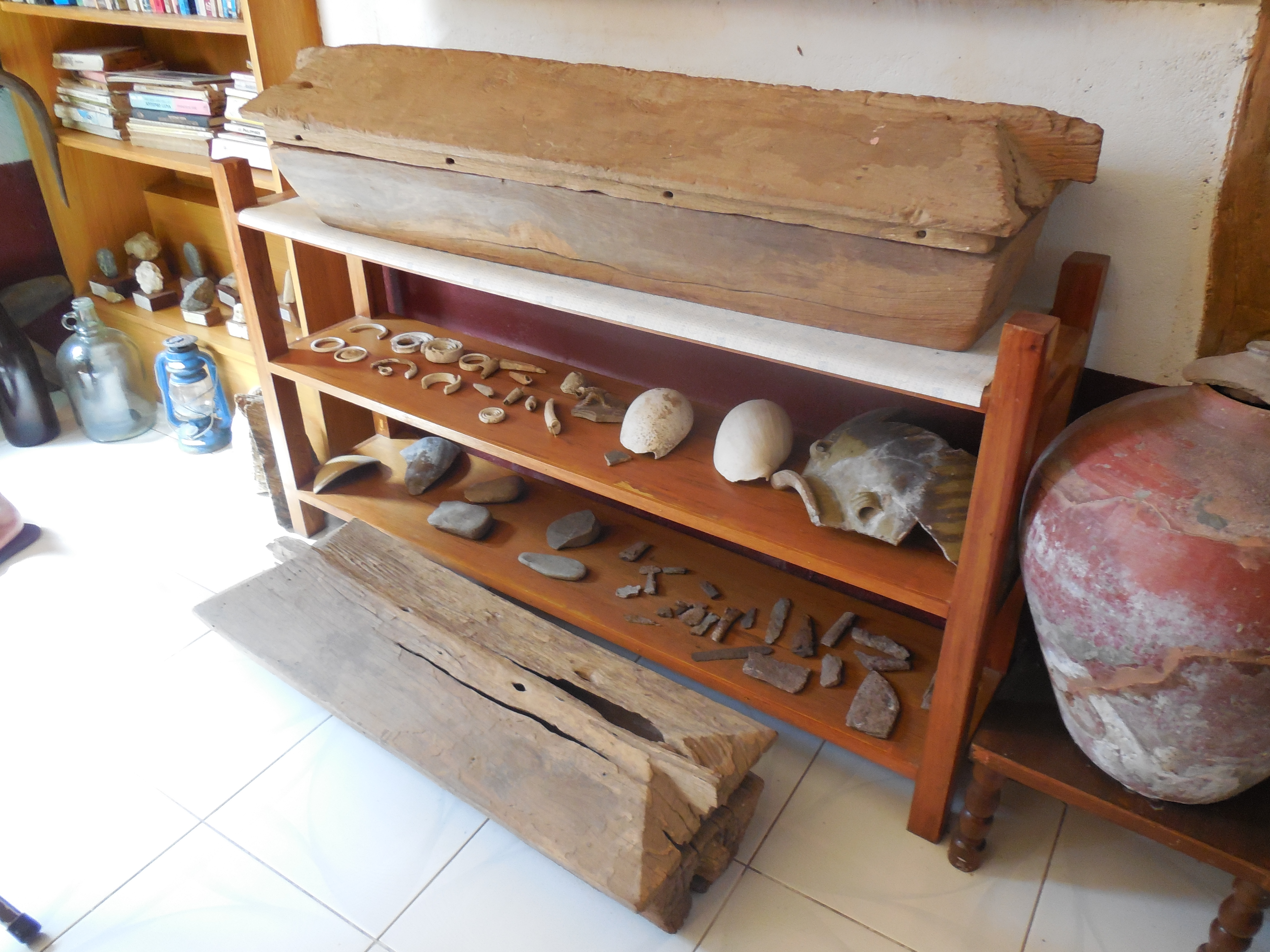
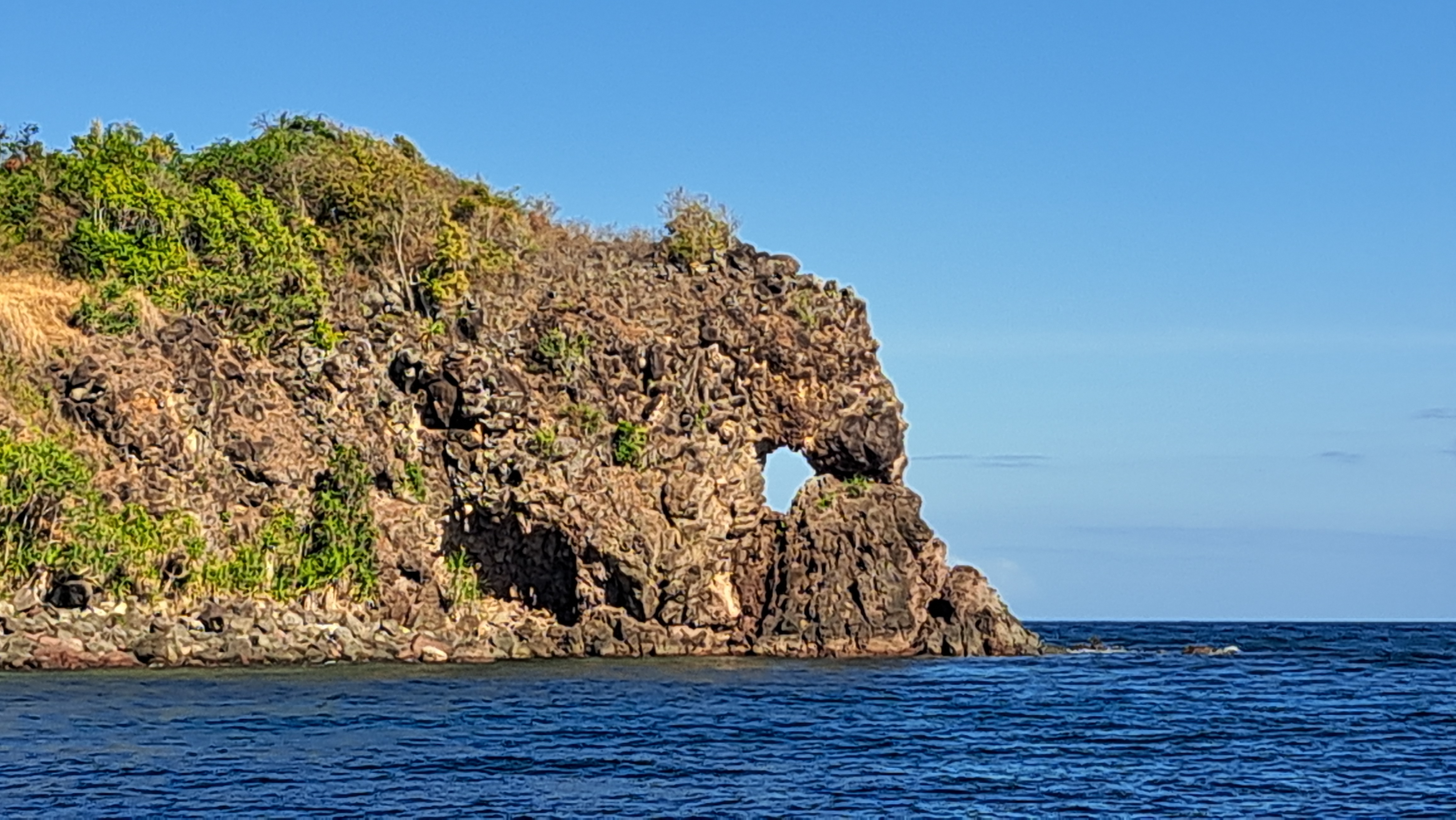
- (From top, left to right) Banton Island, Fort San Jose, the 16th century St. Nicholas de Tolentino Parish Church, Macat-ang Beach in Barangay Mainit, pre-colonial artifacts found in Banton's Guyangan Cave System, and Pasilagon Point Natural Arch in Barangay Banice.

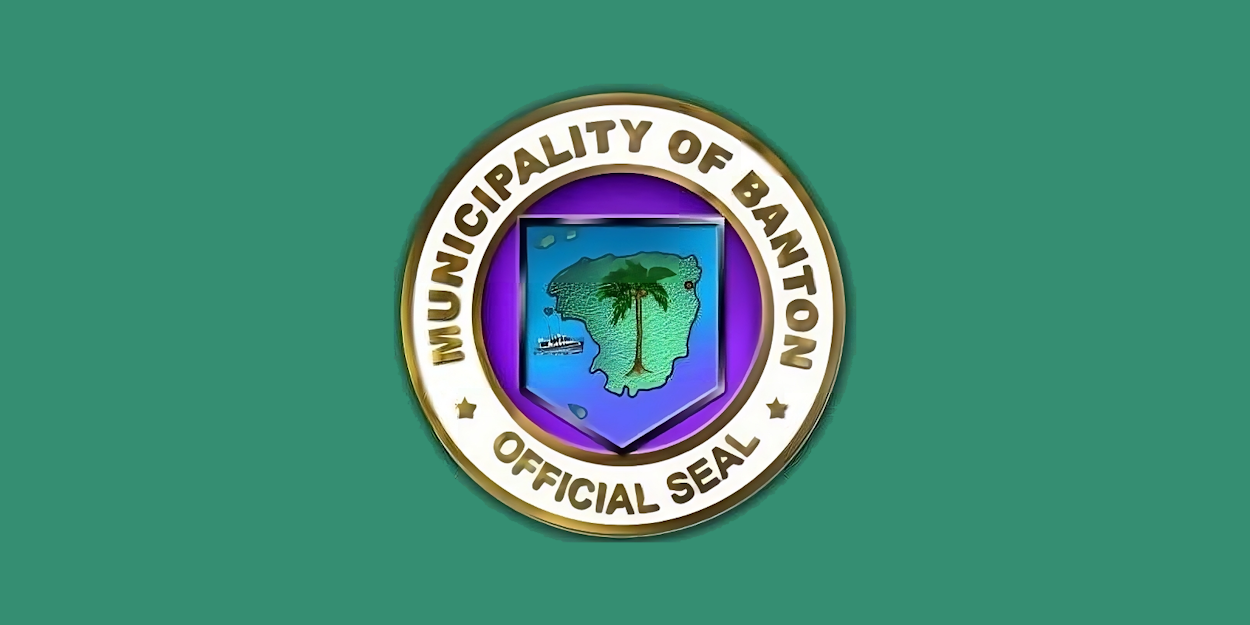
- Flag Seal

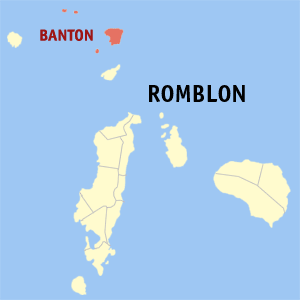
- Map of Romblon with Banton highlighted
- Interactive map of Banton
- Location within the Philippines
- Coordinates: 12°56′46″N 122°05′46″E
- Country: Philippines
- Region: Mimaropa
- Province: Romblon
- District: Lone district
- Founded: 1622
- Barangays: 17 (see Barangays)

Government
  - Type: Sangguniang Bayan
  - Mayor: Milagros F. Faderanga
  - Vice Mayor: James F. Fadrilan
  - Representative: Eleandro Jesus F. Madrona
  - Councilors: Villardo Fadallan; Monie Faderanga; Bert Fadrilan; Jandy Fajiculay; Beth Fatallo; Renato Faz; Loijorge Fegalan; Ronald Ferrolino
  - Electorate: 3,707 voters (2025)

Area
  - Total: 32.48 km^{2} (12.54 sq mi)
- Elevation: 13 m (43 ft)
- Highest elevation (Mount Ampongo): 607 m (1,991 ft)
- Lowest elevation: 0 m (0 ft)

Population (2024 census)
  - Total: 5,848
  - Density: 180.0/km^{2} (466.3/sq mi)
  - Households: 1,495
- Demonym: Bantoanon

Economy
  - Income class: 5th municipal income class
  - Poverty incidence: 25.23% (2023)
  - Revenue: ₱ 87.24 million (2024)
  - Assets: ₱ 252.3 million (2024)
  - Expenditure: ₱ 74.17 million (2024)
  - Liabilities: ₱ 19.23 million (2024)

Service provider
  - Electricity: Romblon Electric Cooperative (ROMELCO)
- Time zone: UTC+8 (PST)
- ZIP code: 5515
- PSGC: 1705902000
- IDD : area code: +63 (0)42
- Native languages: Bantoanon; Tagalog
- Patron saint: San Nicolas de Tolentino

Banton, officially the Municipality of Banton (Bantoanon: Banwa it Banton, Filipino: Bayan ng Banton, formerly known as Jones), is a municipality in the province of Romblon, Philippines. According to the 2024 census, it has a population of 5,848 people.

Its territory encompasses the entire Banton Island and a few uninhabited smaller islands. The island is located in the northern portion of the province and lies in the northern portion of the Sibuyan Sea near the southern tip of Marinduque. It is a town of about 5,000 people majority of which speak the Bantoanon language (also known as Asi), one of the five primary branches of the Bisayan languages.

Banton is thought to have been inhabited by Filipinos since the pre-colonial period, based on analysis of human remains, coffins, an ancient burial cloth and other archaeological finds discovered at the Guyangan Cave System by the National Museum in 1936. The present settlement was founded in 1622 by the Spanish and is the oldest settlement in the province. During the American colonial period, the municipality changed its name to Jones in honor of American congressman William Jones, who authored the Philippine Autonomy Act of 1916. Today, Banton is one of Romblon's thriving municipalities, with an economy dependent on copra farming, fishing, raffia palm weaving, and tourism. The island is collectively known as a cultural landscape due to its historical, cultural and archaeological value to humanity.

== Etymology ==
The name "Banton" was derived from the Asi word batoon, meaning "rocky", referring to the mountainous and rocky topography of the island due to its volcanic origin. Another possible origin is the word bantoy, which is the Asi word for the venomous stonefish.

== History ==
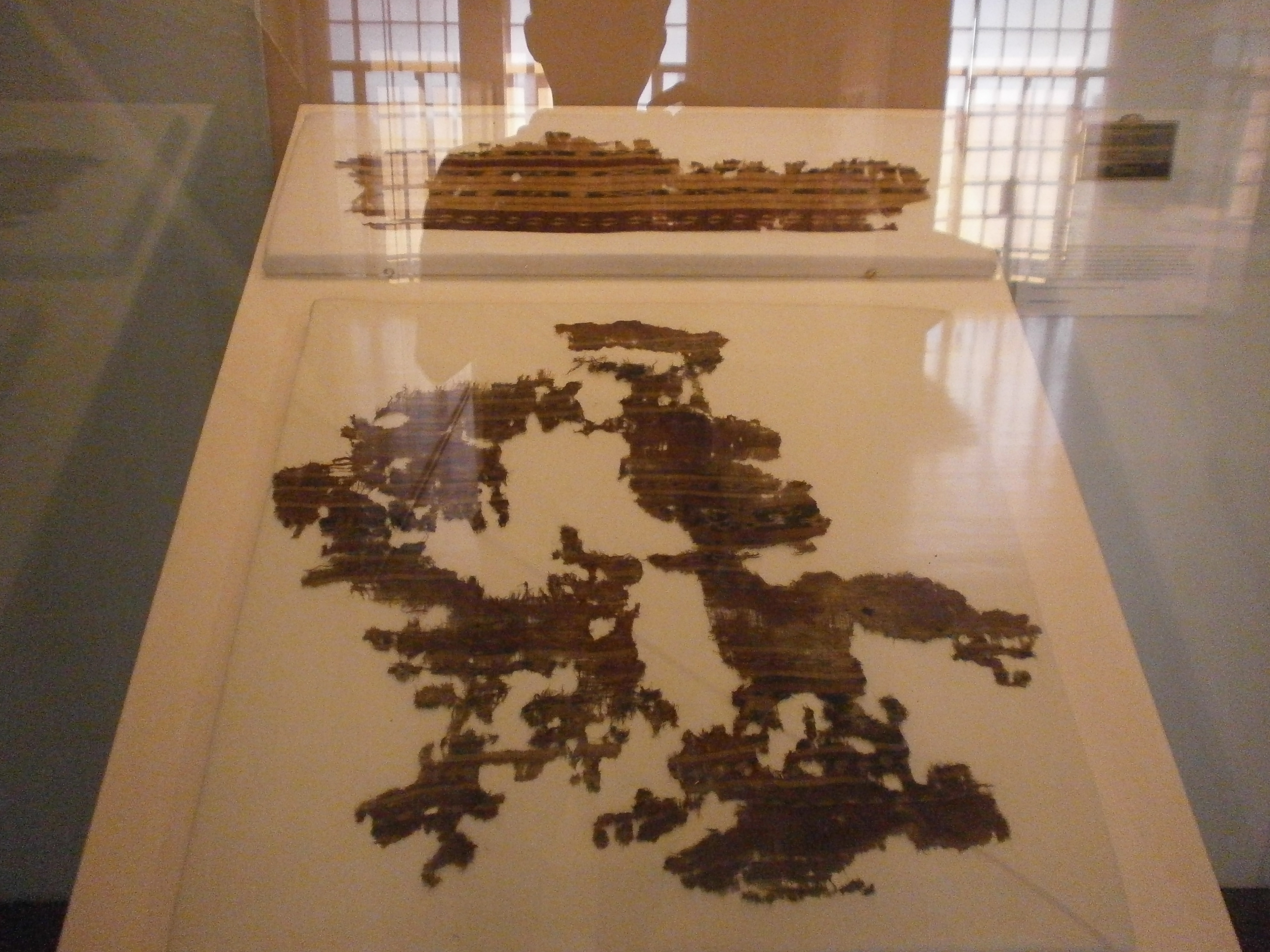
The Banton Cloth, the oldest existing example of warp ikat in Southeast Asia, displayed at the National Museum of the Philippines.

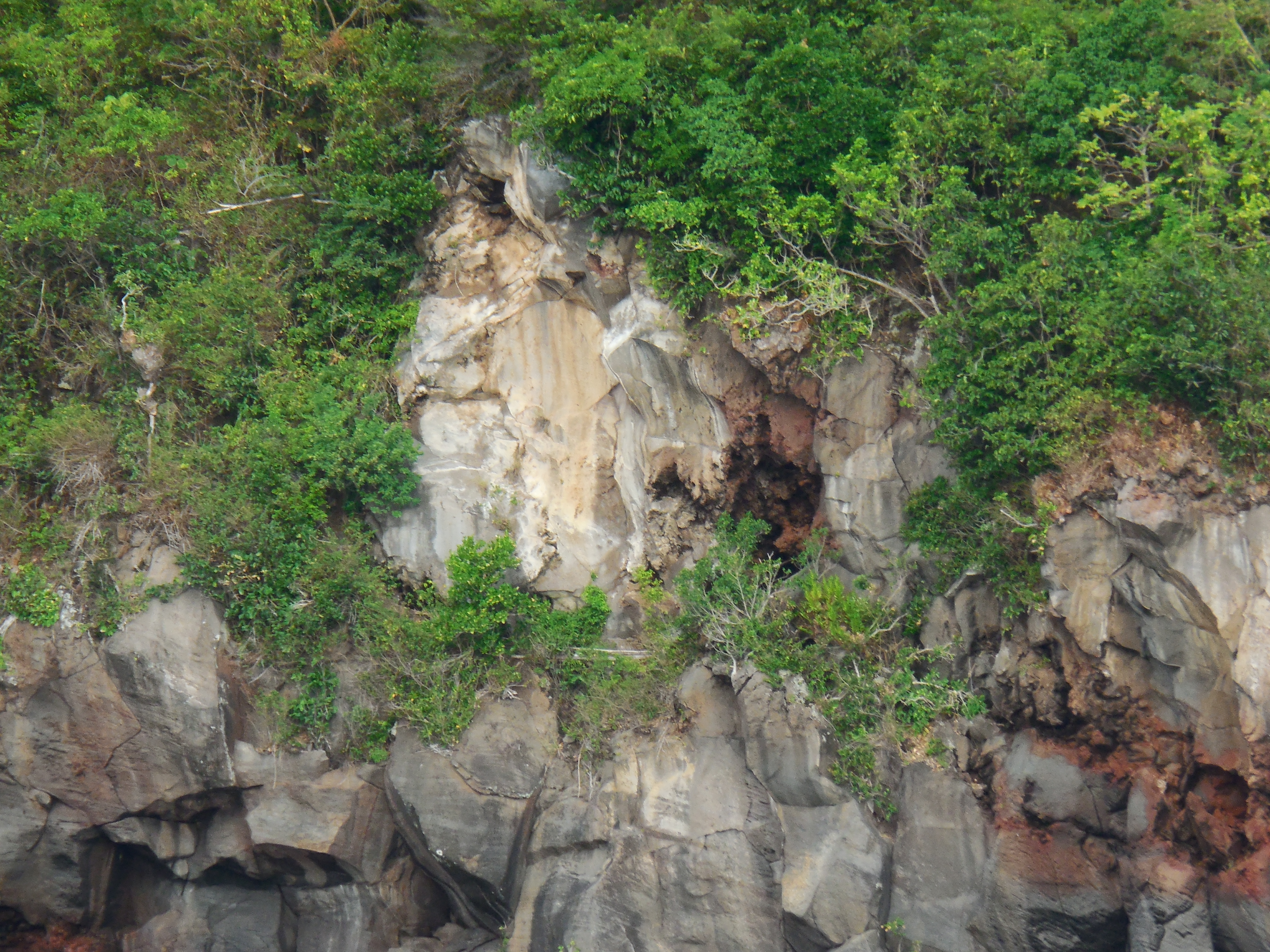
Ipot Cave, where the earliest known warp ikat textile in Southeast Asia was found in 1936

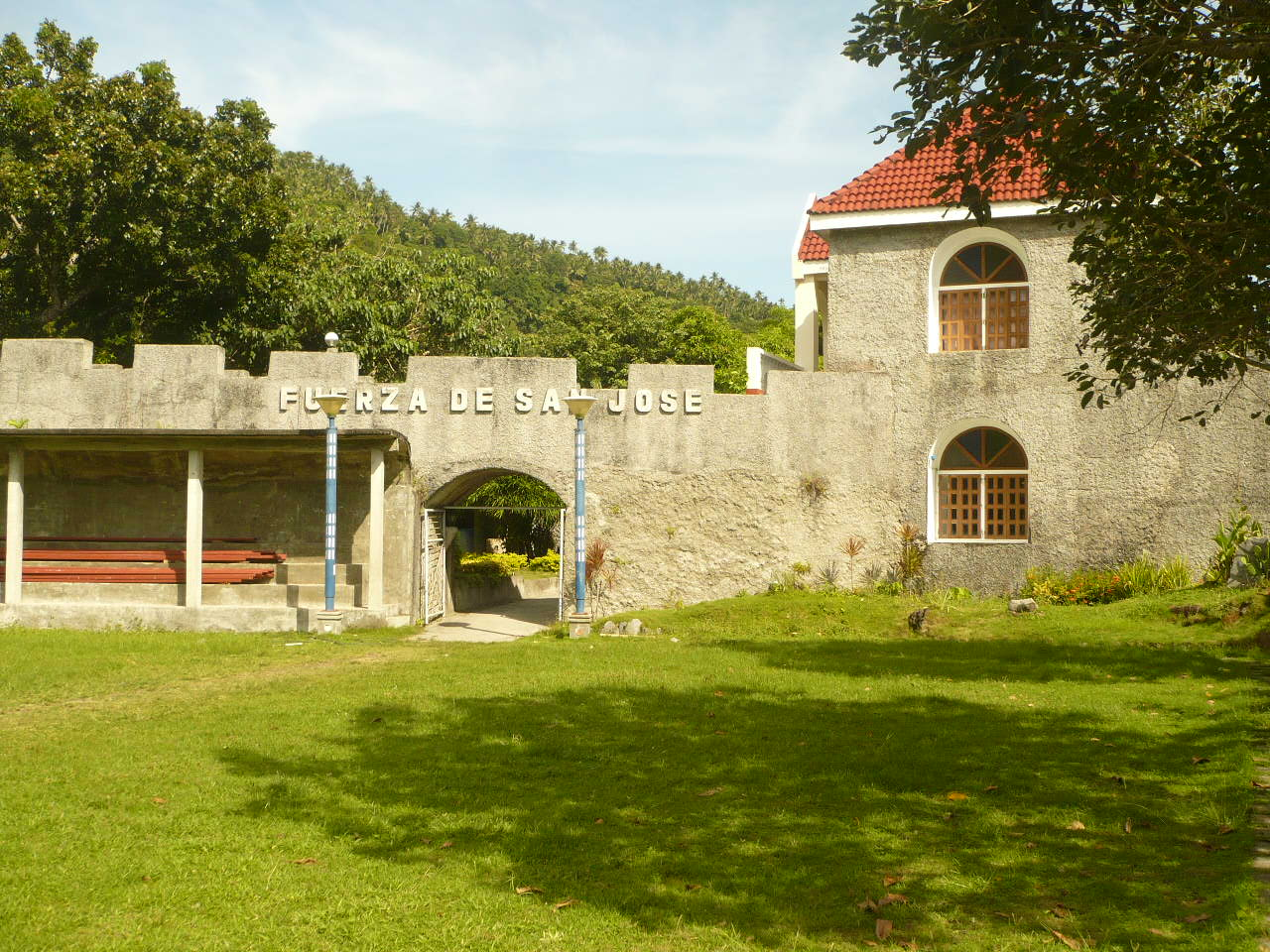
Fuerza de San José, Banton's Spanish colonial era fort

=== Early history ===
Banton was already inhabited during pre-colonial times as proven by ancient artefacts such as wooden coffins and skeletal remains found in the island's Guyangan Cave System in 1936 by a team of researchers from the National Museum of the Philippines. Among the artefacts was the Banton Cloth, a piece of a traditional burial cloth found in one of the wooden coffins. It is estimated to be 400 years old, making it the earliest known warp ikat (tie-resist dyeing) textile in the Philippines and Southeast Asia. These artifacts are now preserved at the National Museum of Anthropology in Manila.

The municipality of Banton was established by Spanish colonial authorities in 1622, the first town established in Romblon, which was then part of Capiz province. It was initially founded in a site in Bacoco Hill (now part of Barangay Hambian), south-west of its present site. The administration of the other islands of Romblon were put under the jurisdiction of Banton until 1631, when Pueblo de Romblon was founded. In 1640, due to frequent raids by Moros, who looted and pillaged the settlement, the limestone fort called Fuerza de San Jose and the San Nicolas de Tolentino Parish Church was constructed under the leadership of Father Agustin de San Pedro, also known as El Padre Capitan, who was the parish priest of Banton at that time. The construction was completed in 1644, and in 1648, San Nicolas de Tolentino was installed as the town's patron saint. The fort effectively protected the town against further Moro raids. Banton ceased being part of Capiz when the Spanish colonial government created the politico-military province of Romblon on 11 January 1868.

=== 20th century ===
When civilian government was introduced in Romblon by the Americans on 16 March 1901, Banton was one of the 11 new municipalities reinstated or created. In 1918, the municipality was renamed Jones in honor of American congressman William Atkinson Jones, who authored the Philippine Autonomy Act of 1916 that provided for greater autonomy for the Philippines under American colonial rule. On 8 June 1940, with the passage of Commonwealth Act No. 581, all of Romblon's municipalities were dissolved and Jones, together with Corcuera and Concepcion, were consolidated into a special municipality called Maghali, one of four special municipalities that the law created (the rest being Romblon, Tablas and Sibuyan). The reorganization proved to be difficult for the province's local leaders, and after World War II, Republic Act No. 38 repealed Commonwealth Act No. 581, restoring Jones to its pre-war status. On 24 April 1959, Republic Act No. 2158 restored the island to its former name, Banton.

=== 21st century ===
In 2013, Banton was one of the sites of a detailed resource assessment by the Department of Energy (DOE), along with Maricaban Island in Batangas and Balut Island in Saranggani. The study aimed to determine whether the island can be a site for low enthalpy geothermal power generation. However, no exploitable geothermal resource has been delineated on the island. On 19 March 2013, the National Museum of the Philippines declared the island's Guyangan Cave System, where precolonial wooden coffins, remains, and the Banton Cloth were found, as an Important Cultural Property.

The island municipality was greatly devastated by Typhoon Melor on 15 December 2015, which made its fourth landfall over the island, and by Typhoon Kammuri on 3 December 2019, which made its second landfall over the island. The typhoon destroyed or damaged 912 houses in the island municipality, while 42 percent of agricultural lands were damaged. The estimated cost of damage to infrastructure in the town was ₱39 million.

In 2020, the population of the Philippine long-tailed macaque (Macaca fascicularis philippensis) in the island was found to have increased over previously documented levels, with the monkeys destroying crops and raiding homes. The Department of Environment and Natural Resources sent a team to the island, which confirmed the population increase. To control its population, the team suggested that the macaques be exported to monkey farms in Luzon for use in scientific research on diseases such as Ebola. Nedim Buyukmihci, a professor emeritus of veterinary medicine at the University of California-Davis has expressed opposition to the plan.

On 21 October 2020, several fishing boats in the villages of Mainit and Yabawon on the western side of the island municipality were destroyed by huge waves caused by Typhoon Saudel, which passed over the central portion of Luzon Island in the north of the Philippines. A few days later, on 25 October, the island municipality was devastated by Typhoon Molave, which made landfall over Torrijos, Marinduque, just north of the island. PAGASA raised typhoon Signal No. 3 over the island, along with the rest of northern Romblon, as the typhoon passed over the province with winds of up to 130 kph. The typhoon caused a landslide along the Togbongan-Nabalay Road on the north of the island and also destroyed several homes and agricultural lands.

In 2021 and 2022, the island municipality marked two important milestones: On 15 March 2021, Banton marked a year of being COVID-19 free since the community quarantine in the Philippines began. It joined 23 other municipalities in the distinguished status. In August 2022, the town celebrated its 400th founding anniversary with a host of religious and festive social activities, including a ceremonial release of balloons.

On 16 July 2023, MV Maria Helena, a ROPAX ferry owned and operated by Montenegro Shipping Lines intentionally beached in Barangay Nasunogan after it tilted in the Sibuyan Sea while en route to San Agustin from Lucena. The incident was caused by a tire blowout in one of the vehicles being carried by the ferry amid rough seas, causing the vehicle the tilt and its lashing to snap, and resulting in vehicle pileup on the port side of the vessel. All 120 passengers and crew were rescued. The vessel has since been righted, its cargo transferred to another vessel, and has sailed back to Lucena for repairs.

== Geography ==
Banton lies on the northern portion of the Sibuyan Sea and is equidistant between Marinduque Island to the north and Tablas Island to the south. It is composed of the main island of Banton and the uninhabited islands of Bantoncillo, Carlota and Isabel, the last two of which are collectively known as the Dos Hermanas Islands. There is also Polloc Islet near Tabonan Beach just off the northwest portion of the island and part of Barangay Yabawon.

The Islands of Banton, Romblon
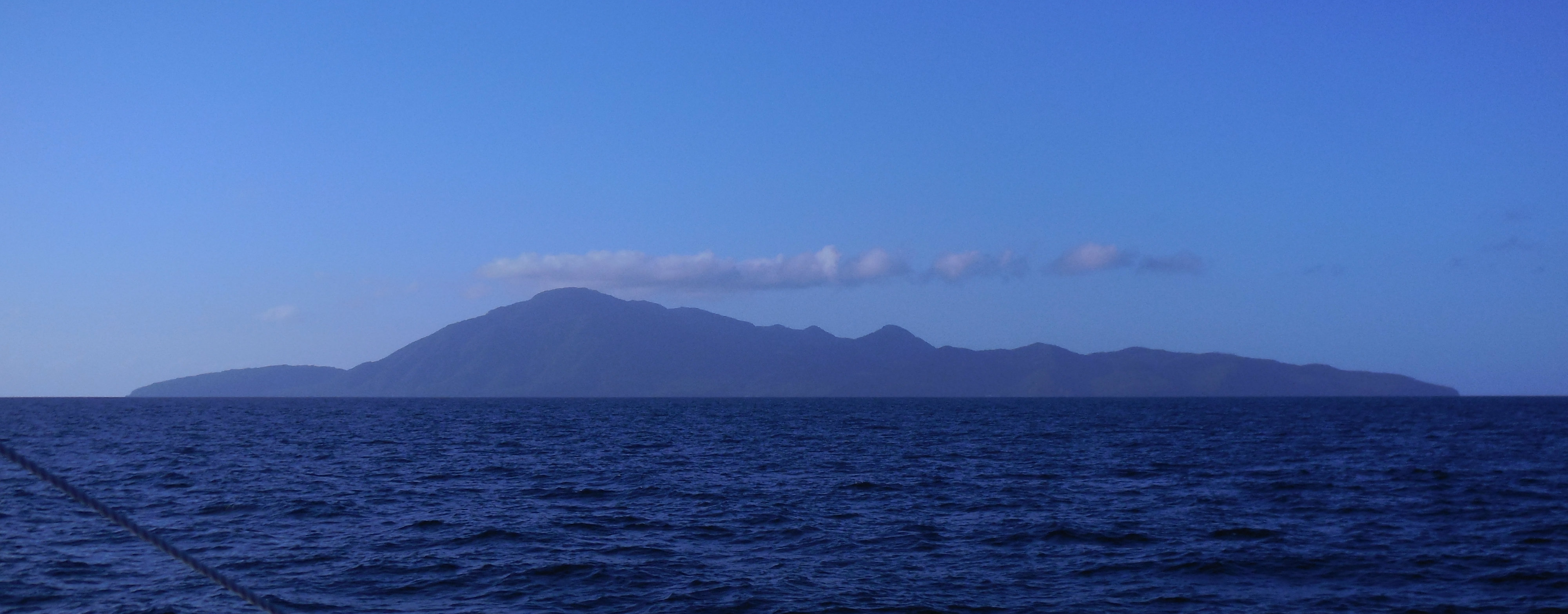
Banton Island, where the main settlement is located.

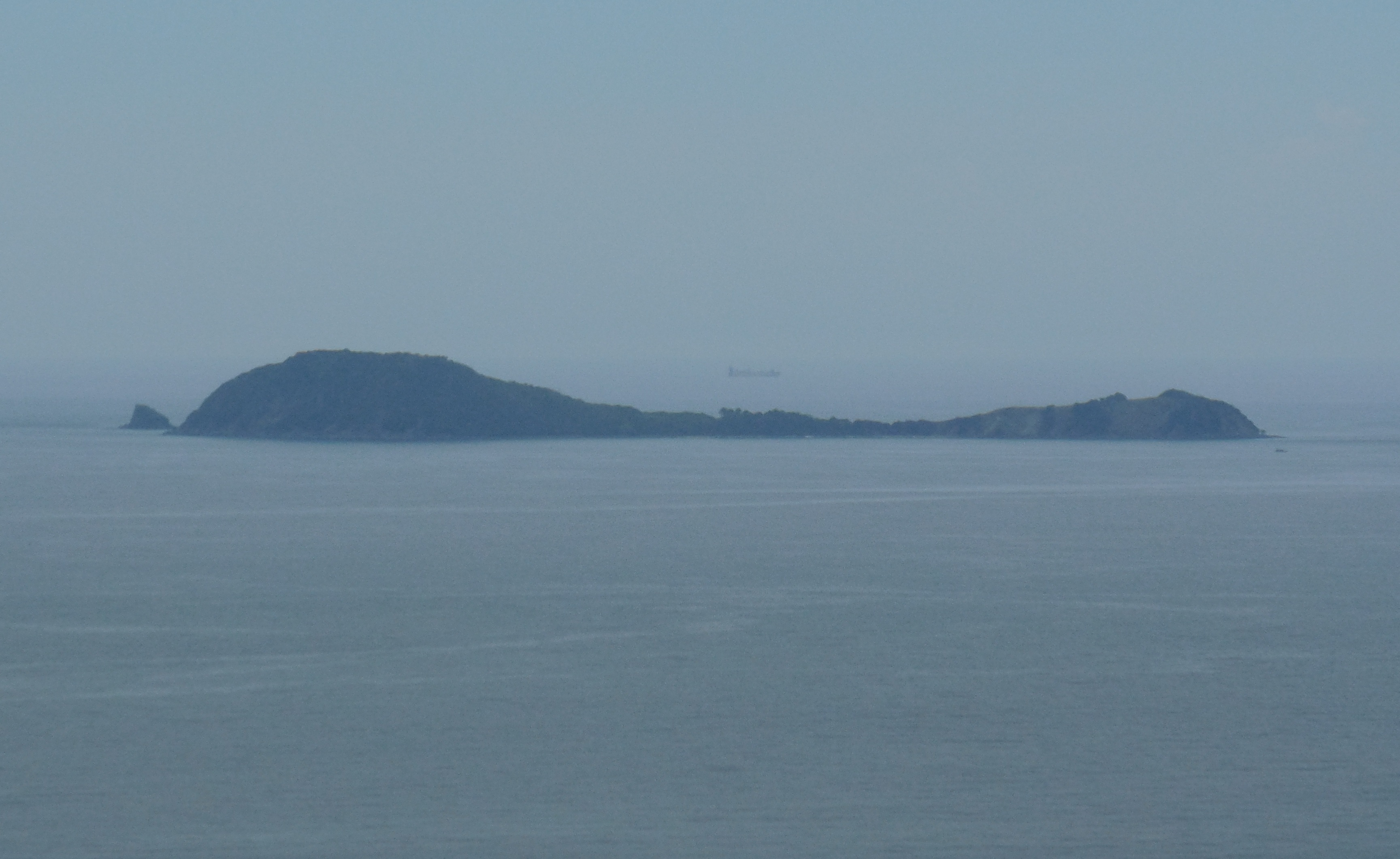
Bantoncillo Island, also known as Gakot Island.

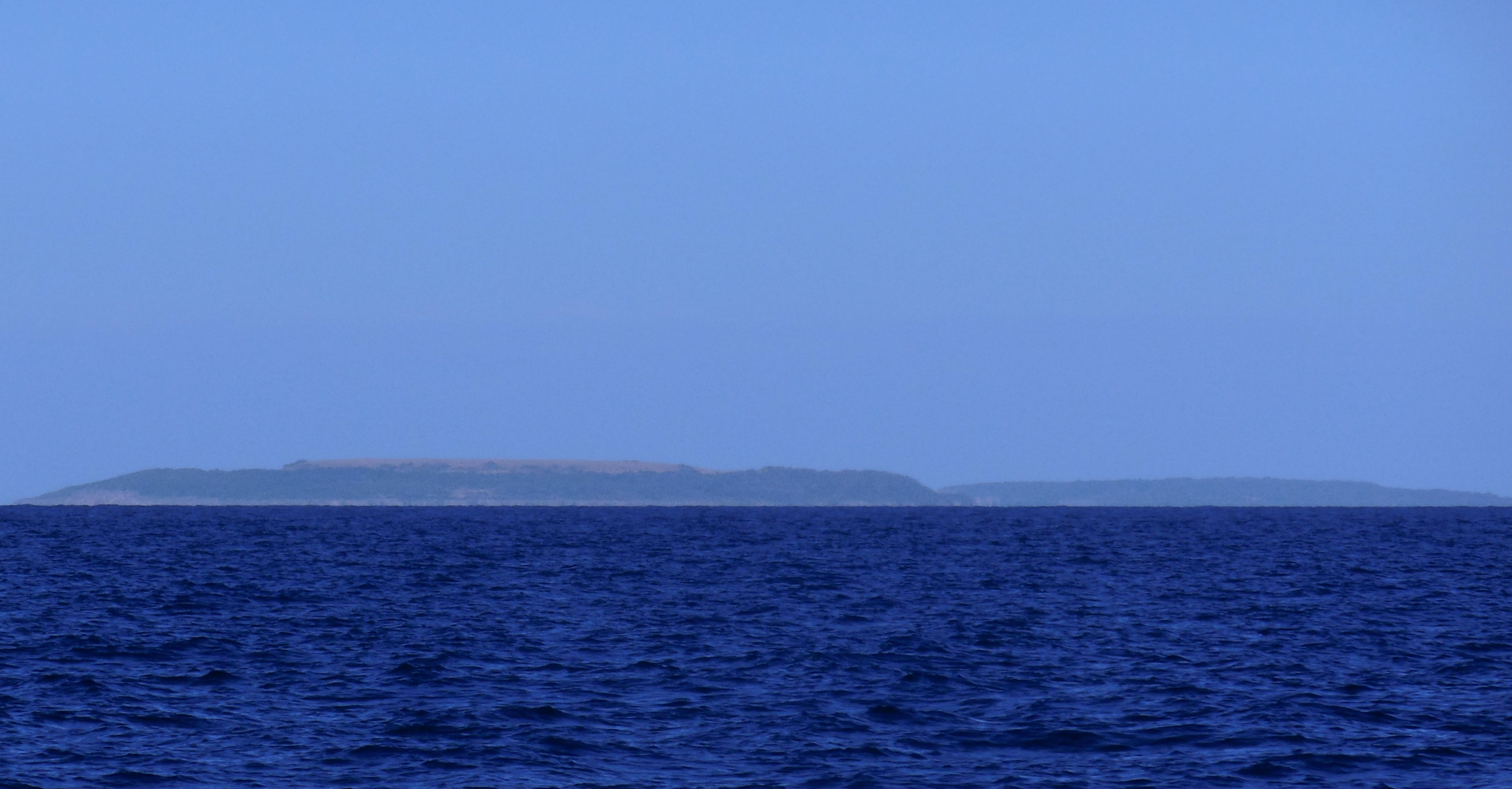
The Dos Hermanas Islands, composed of Carlota and Isabel Islands.

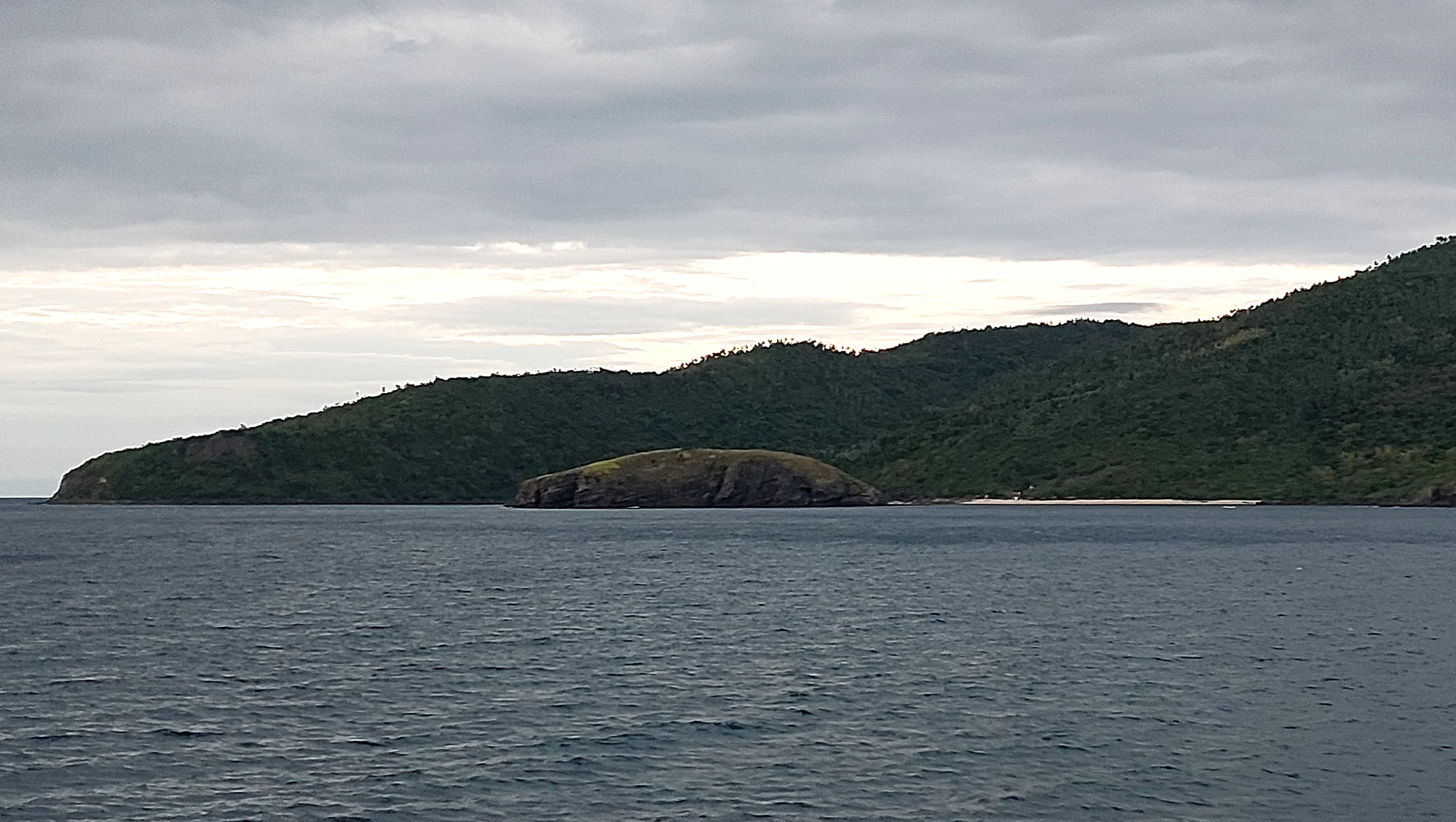
Polloc, an uninhabited island a few meters off the coast of Tabunan Beach in Barangay Yabawon.

Banton has a total land area of 3,248 hectares (32.48 km^{2}). Based on rock petrology, the island is a dormant volcano which lies at the southernmost portion of the Pleistocene-Quaternary West Luzon volcanic arc and may have been active during the Pliocene period. Because of its volcanic origin, the island has a mountainous, rocky topography, with very few patches of flat land suitable for farming. The island's highest elevation, Mount Ampongo, rises at 596 metres (1,955 ft).

=== Barangays ===
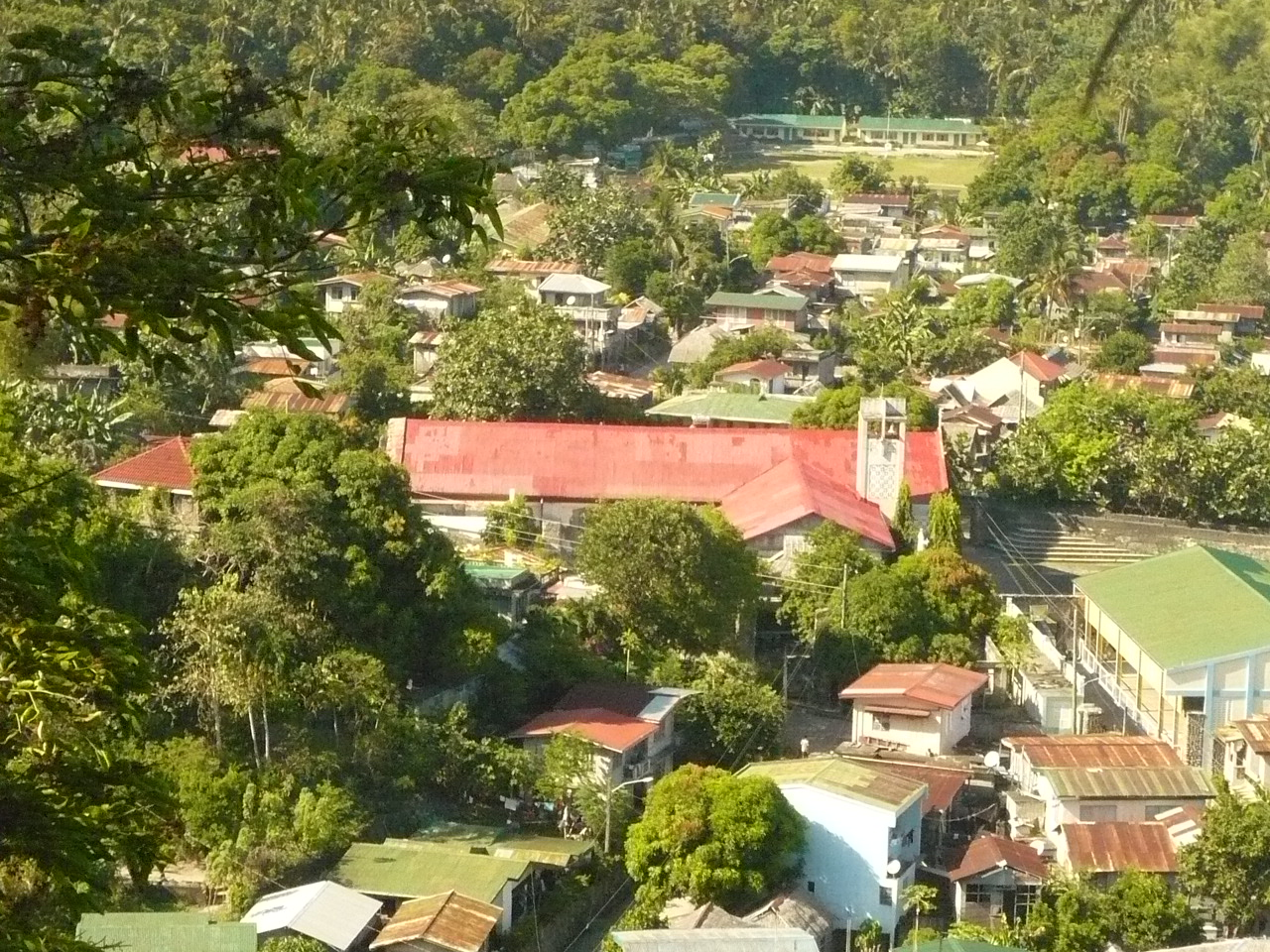
Bird's eye view of Barangay Poblacion

Banton is politically subdivided into 17 barangays. Each barangay consists of puroks and some have sitios.

In 1954, the sitios of Mahaba, Angomon, Solocan, Kapanranan, and Yabawon were consolidated into the barangay known as Yabawon.

- Balogo
- Banice
- Hambi-an
- Lagang
- Libtong
- Mainit
- Nabalay
- Nasunogan
- Poblacion
- Sibay
- Tan-Ag
- Toctoc
- Togbongan
- Togong
- Tungonan
- Tumalum
- Yabawon

=== Climate ===
Climate data for Banton, Romblon
Month	Jan	Feb	Mar	Apr	May	Jun	Jul	Aug	Sep	Oct	Nov	Dec	Year
Mean daily maximum °C (°F)	28 (82)	29 (84)	29 (84)	27 (81)	32 (90)	31 (88)	29 (84)	30 (86)	31 (88)	30 (86)	29 (84)	28 (82)	29 (84)
Mean daily minimum °C (°F)	23 (73)	24 (75)	24 (75)	23 (73)	25 (77)	25 (77)	24 (75)	25 (77)	25 (77)	25 (77)	24 (75)	24 (75)	25 (77)
Average precipitation mm (inches)	102 (4.0)	27 (1.1)	30 (1.2)	129 (5.1)	120 (4.7)	237 (9.3)	189 (7.4)	186 (7.3)	126 (5.0)	231 (9.1)	162 (6.4)	90 (3.5)	1,629 (64.1)
Average rainy days	14	12	9	11	20	20	21	22	19	21	17	17	203
Source: World Weather Online

As part of Romblon, Banton is classified under Type III of the Corona climatic classification system. This type of climate is described as having no prominent wet or dry seasons. The wet season, which usually occurs from June to November can extend up to December during the onset of the southwest monsoon. The dry season from January to May may sometimes have periods of rainfall or even inclement weather.

== Demographics ==
Population census of Banton
Year	Pop.	±% p.a.
1903	4,043	—
1918	6,060	+2.73%
1939	4,972	−0.94%
1948	5,542	+1.21%
1960	6,155	+0.88%
1970	6,447	+0.46%
1975	7,545	+3.20%
1980	7,362	−0.49%
1990	7,077	−0.39%
1995	6,069	−2.84%
2000	6,769	+2.37%
2007	6,799	+0.06%
2010	5,963	−4.66%
2015	5,536	−1.41%
2020	5,737	+0.75%
2024	5,848	+0.46%
Source: Philippine Statistics Authority

According to the 2024 census, Banton has a population of 5,848 people. The island municipality is sparsely populated with a population density of 180/km^{2} (466/sq mi). According to the Department of the Interior and Local Government (DILG) and the Commission on Elections (COMELEC), in 2013, there were 3,694 registered voters in Banton, spread over 31 electoral precincts. Of this figure, 1,794 are male registered voters, while 1,900 are female.

=== Language ===
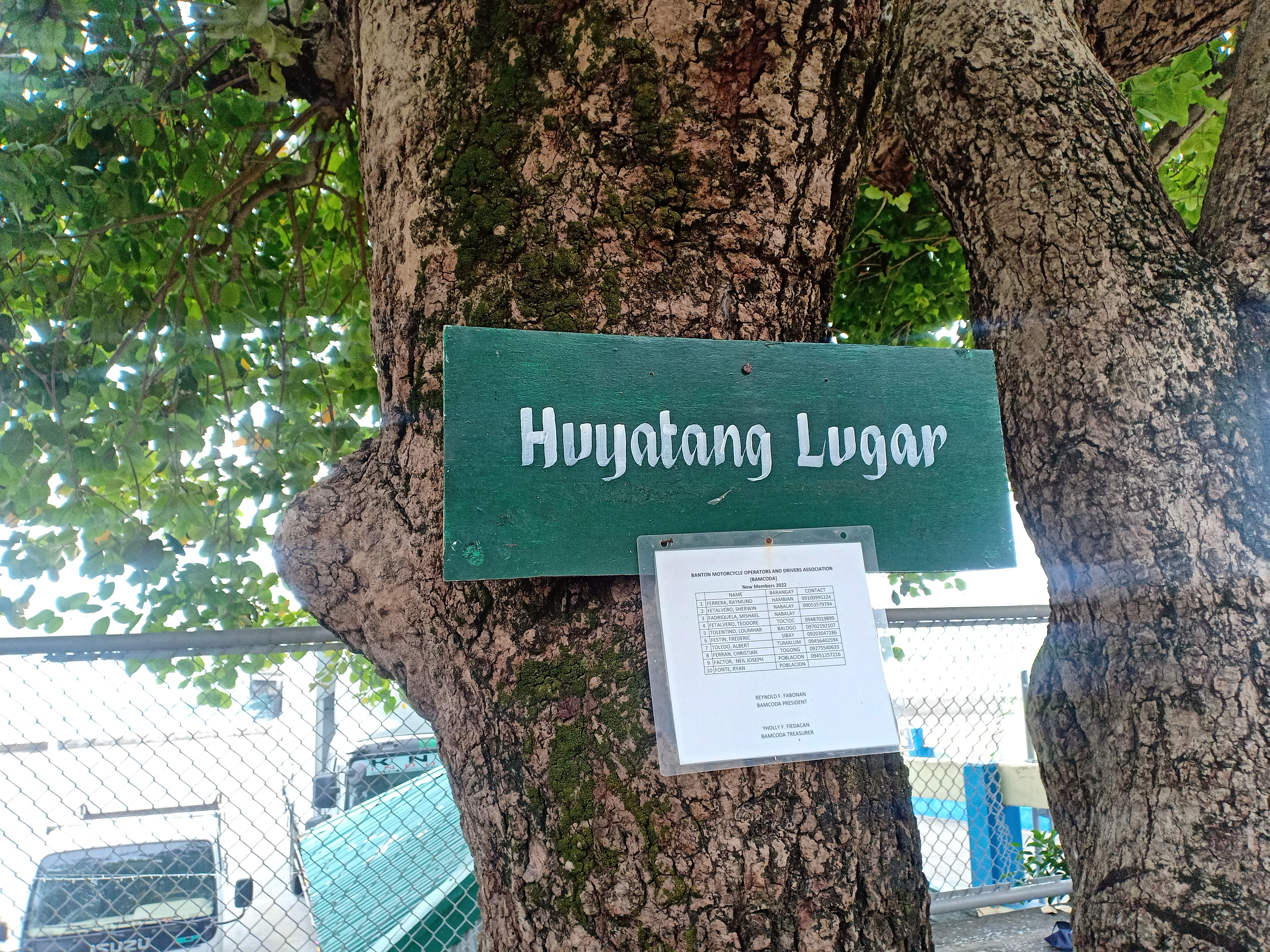
A sign written in the Asi language that says "Huyatang Lugar" (waiting place) for motorcycle taxis.

The island's inhabitants speak the Bantoanon language (also known as Asi), one of three major languages spoken in Romblon and one of five primary branches of the Bisayan language family. The island's inhabitants were the first speakers of the language throughout the province, having spoken it since precolonial times. From Banton, the language spread to other islands such as Maestro de Campo, Simara, and in the towns of Calatrava, and Odiongan in Tablas Island.

David Paul Zorc, a linguist from the Australian National University whose expertise is on Philippine languages, notes that Asi speakers may have been the first Bisayan speakers in the Romblon region. He also suggests that Asi may have a Cebuano substratum and that many of its words may have been influenced by the later influx of other languages such as Romblomanon.

== Economy ==
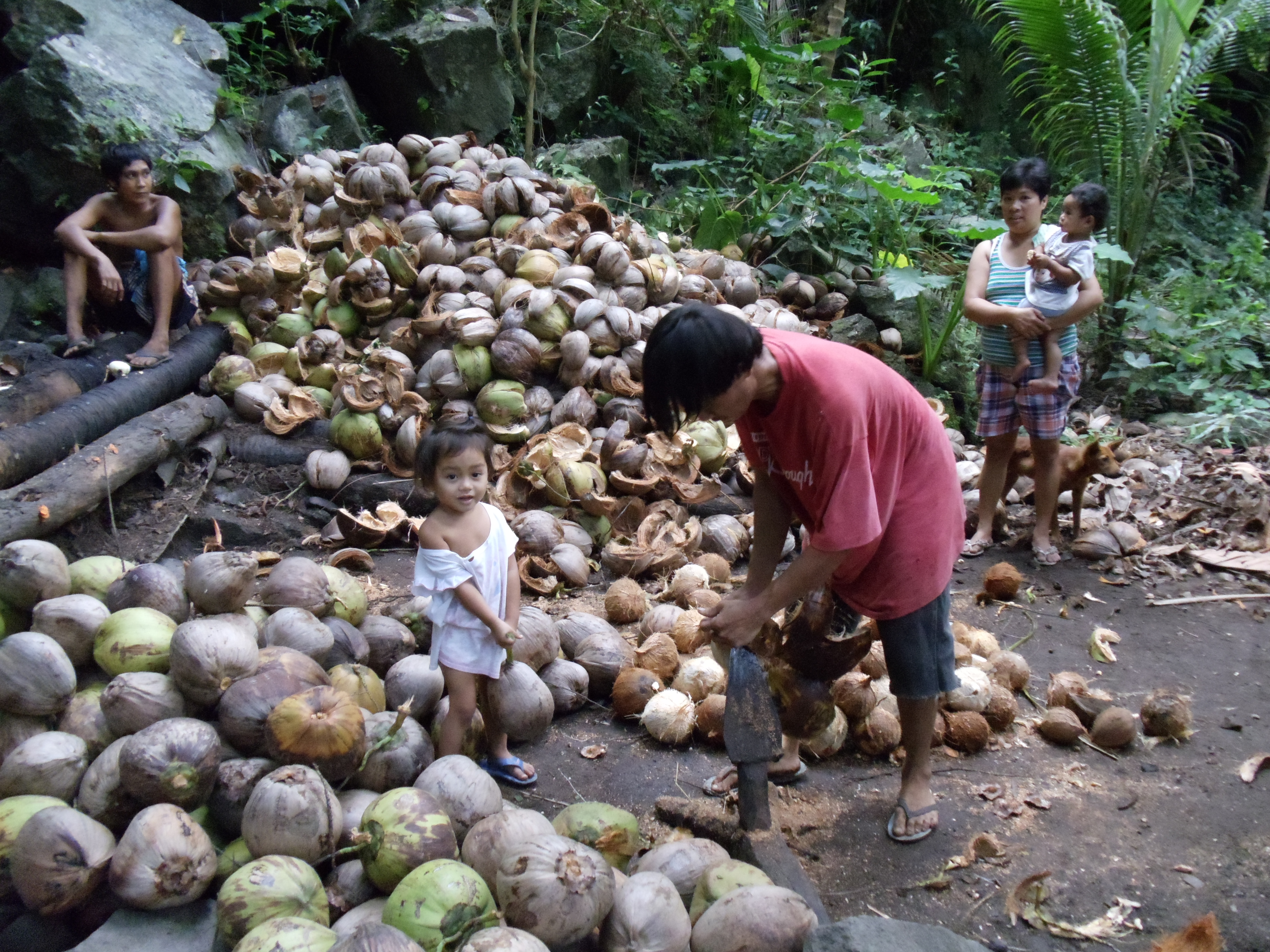
Copra farming in Banton

Banton has a primarily agricultural economy, with copra farming and fishing as the main sources of livelihood. There is also an indigenous raffia palm handicraft industry. Other crops grown in the island are root crops (such as cassava, sweet potatoes), fruits and vegetables. The locals also engage in livestock raising for local consumption, and small-scale shipbuilding of wooden boats and launches.

Due to the island's rocky topography and lack of a stable supply of freshwater, rice production is difficult in the island. Rice from Mindoro, Marinduque or Quezon is supplied to the island by local traders. In recent years, the island has also become a small tourist hub for Asi expatriates and foreign tourists from the United States and other countries.

Poverty incidence of Banton (%)

Source: Philippine Statistics Authority

== Tourism ==
Banton is an eco-tourism and heritage destination due to its beaches, diving sites, caves, churches and Spanish-era fortifications.

=== Heritage sites ===
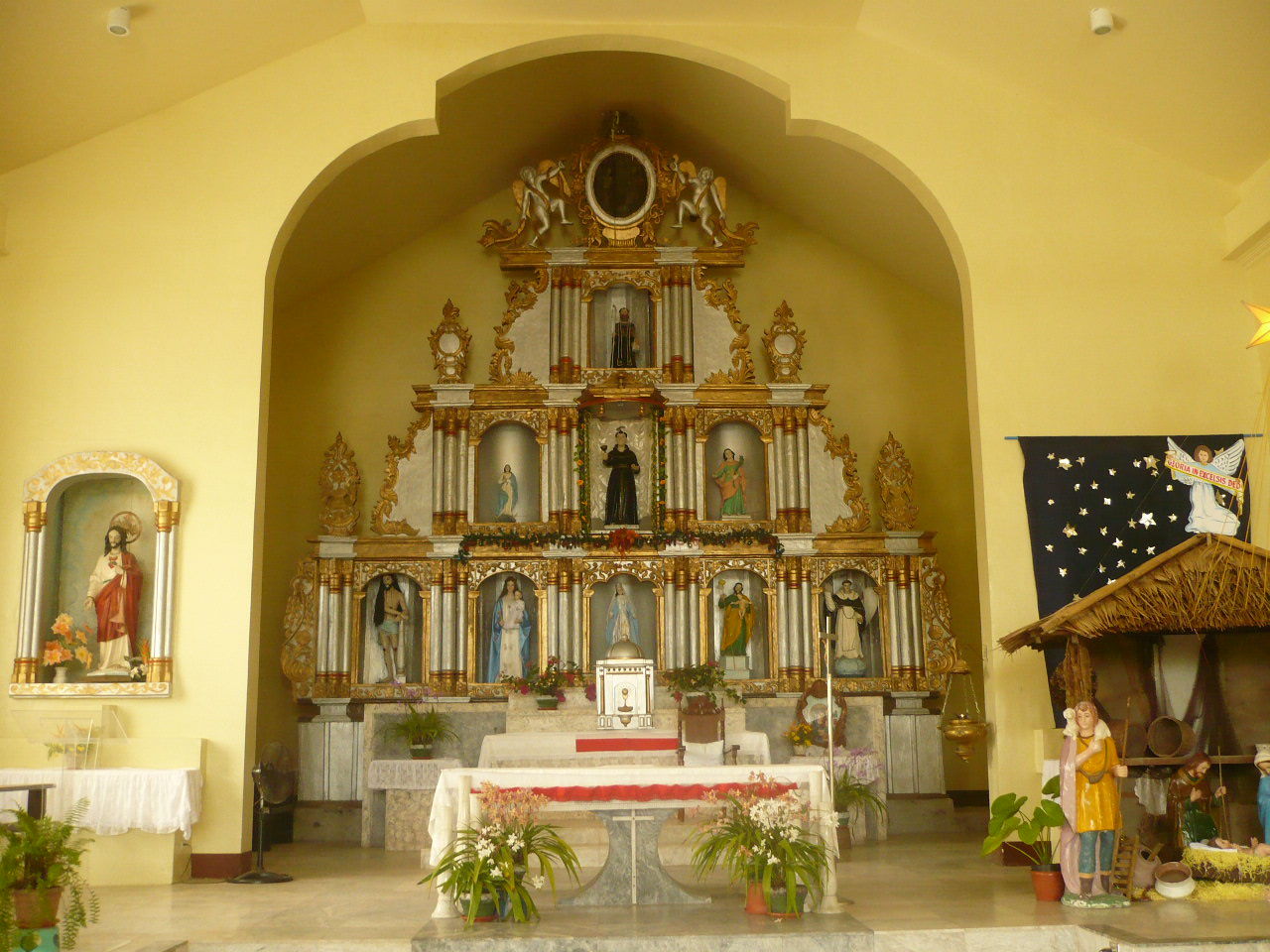
The retablo or altarpiece of Banton Church showing different Catholic saints.

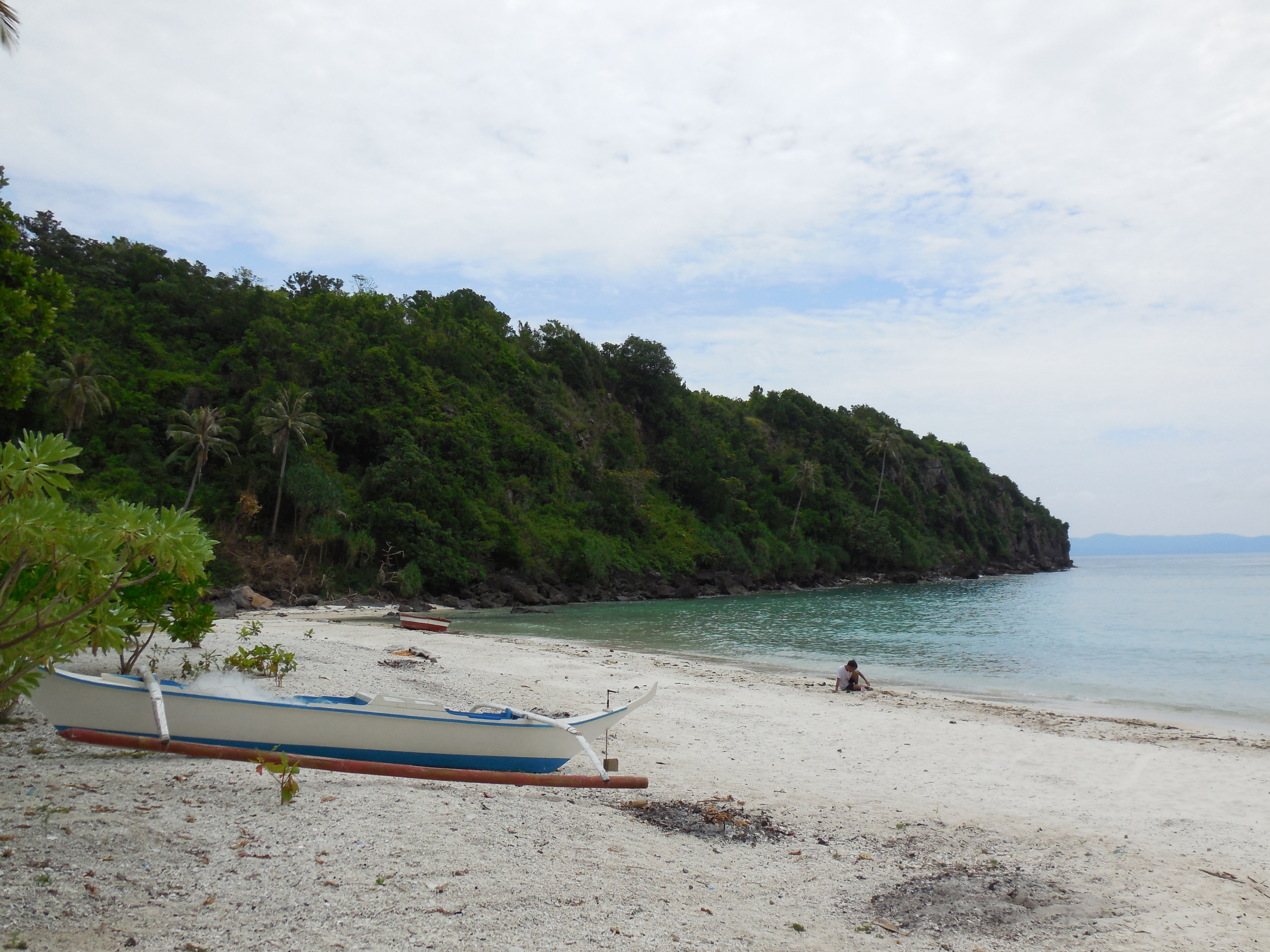
Tambak Beach

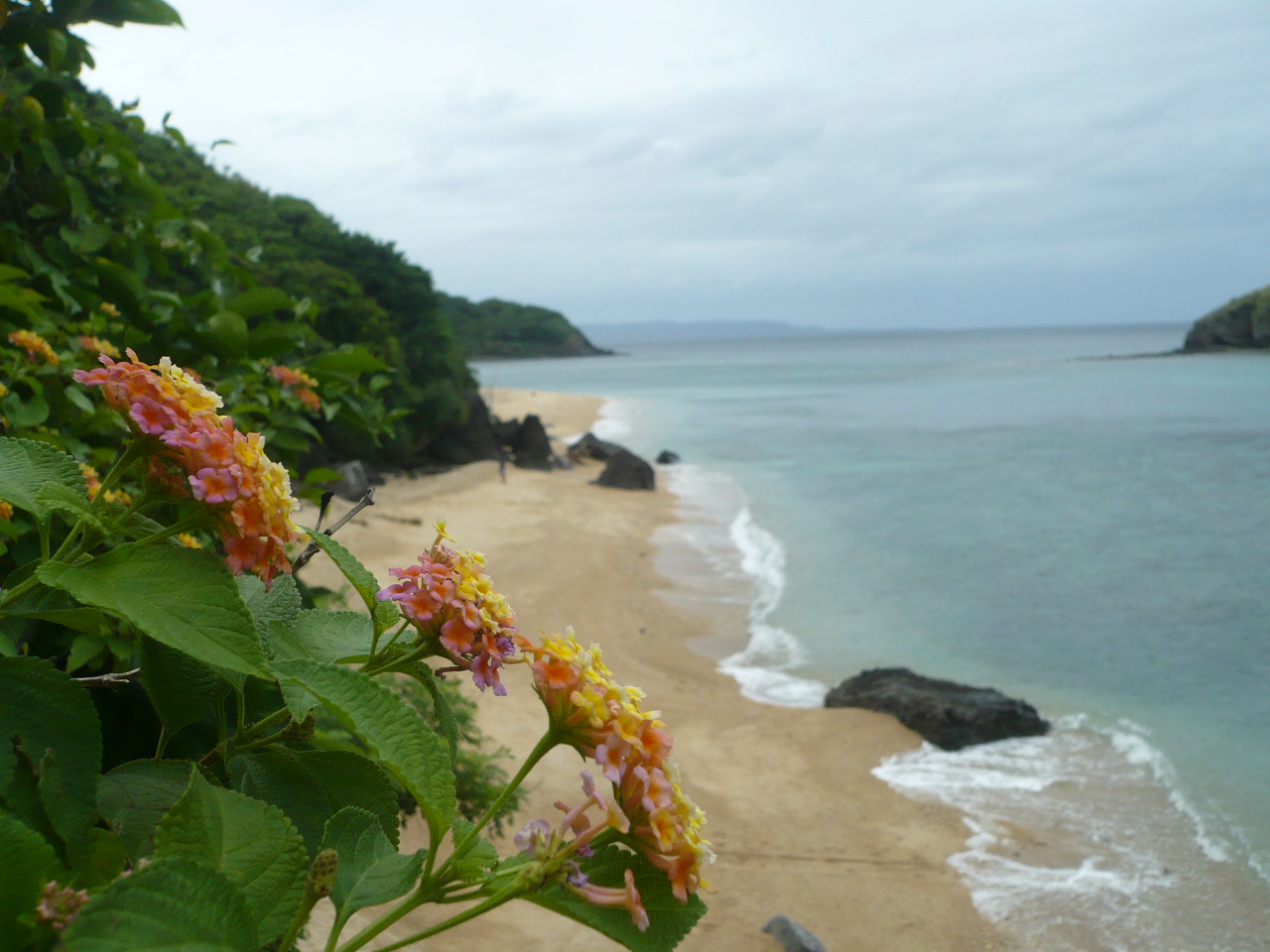
Tabonan Beach

Being the oldest settlement in Romblon, Banton has several Spanish-era fortifications and churches, as well as American-era houses. These include Fuerza de San José, Banton Church, the old campanile made of limestone at Everlast in Barangay Poblacion, and a limestone watchtower at Onte in Barangay Toctoc. There is an American-era house at Pinagkaisahan in Barangay Poblacion which used to be the Ugat Faigao Museum but now serves as a sari-sari store. The Asi Studies Center for Culture and the Arts (also in Purok Everlast) serves as an information center for the Asi language and Banton history, as well as depository of Banton's archaeological and cultural artifacts. The Church of San Nicolas de Tolentino also has a small museum of pre-colonial and Spanish-era artifacts. Among these artifacts is an intricate jar known locally as balogodibo, which three children accidentally found at Barangay Balogo in 2010.

The National Museum of the Philippines also announced in 2016 the construction of a site museum near the island's Guyangan Cave System on a 1.5-hectare (3.7-acre) property donated by the Fabicon family. The site museum will serve as depository of the island's cultural treasures and will conduct research on how to best preserve the island's intangible heritage.

=== Natural formations ===
Caves are Banton's well-known natural formations. The Guyangan Cave System, situated at the boundary of Barangay Toctoc and Togbongan, has seven caves, some of which were inhabited during pre-colonial times, and is now an Important Cultural Treasure as declared by the National Museum. Guyangan Hill, where the caves are situated, also has a natural view deck called Manamyaw overlooking Barangay Poblacion and the Sibuyan Sea. On a clear day, the islands of Sibuyan, Romblon, and Tablas, as well as Burias Island, can be easily seen from Manamyaw. The island has several rock formations as well. Punta Matagar in Barangay Poblacion is a pointed rock formation in the shape of a spear or arrow head. In Barangay Banice, on the southern portion of the island, lies Pasilagon Point Natural Arch, said to be the anchorage of "Lolo Amang", a mythological figure in Romblon's nautical folklore similar to the Flying Dutchman.

=== Beaches ===
Several beaches dot Banton's coast including Macat-ang, Tabonan, Mahaba, Recodo, Togbongan, Mainit, and Tambak beaches. Some like Macat-ang, Tabonan, and Tambak are white sand beaches, while others, like Togbongan, are pebbled and rocky. The island's waters are also well-known dive sites, with corals that serve as breeding ground for groupers, snappers, sharks, and stingrays.

=== Festivals ===
Banton has annual religious and cultural festivals. The Sanrokan festival showcases the local tradition of sharing food, especially viand, among neighbors and starts from Holy Saturday up to Easter Sunday. The festival has two phases: the Sanrokan sa Barangay (sharing of food in the villages) and the Sanrokan sa Poblacion (sharing of food at the town proper). Parlor games such as chasing the pig and palosebo (climbing a greased bamboo pole to claim a prize) are held during the celebration. This is followed by the Hanrumanan (meaning "souvenir/legacy") street dancing and parade. Meanwhile, every year, on 10 September, the entire island pays tribute and homage to the town's patron saint, San Nicolas de Tolentino through the Biniray festival. Holy mass is held during feast day, followed by the parading of the saint's image around town. This leads to a fluvial parade around the island, with each village giving homage to the saint. Bantoanons also hold an annual Via Crucis during the Holy Week and Flores de Mayo in May.

== Government ==
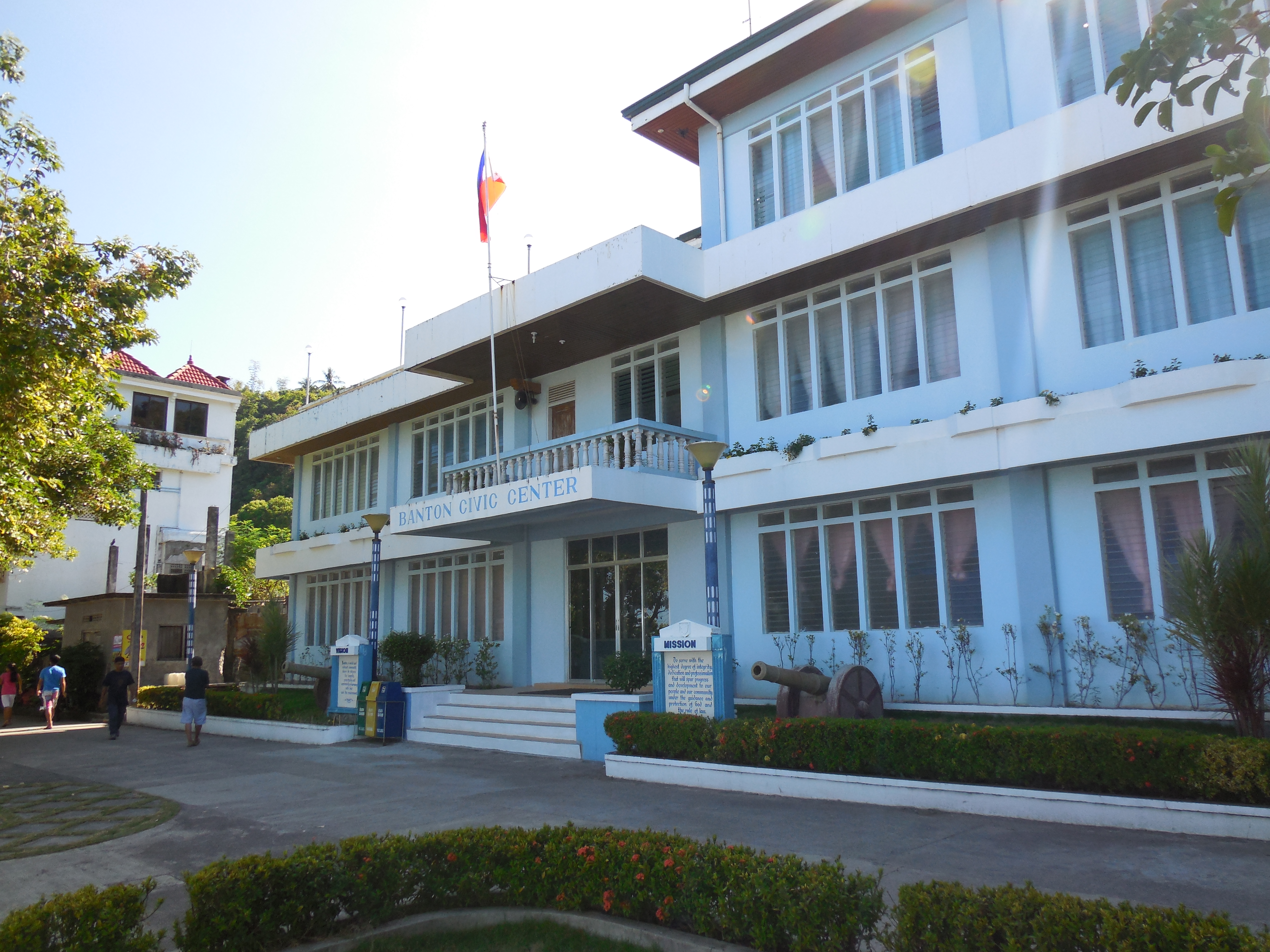
Banton Civic Center in Barangay Poblacion is the seat of the municipal government of Banton, Romblon

=== Local government ===
As a municipality in the Province of Romblon, government officials in the provincial level are voted by the electorates of the town. The provincial government have political jurisdiction over local transactions of the municipal government.

Pursuant to the Local Government Code of 1991, the municipality of Banton is composed of a mayor (alkalde), a vice mayor (bise alkalde) and eight members (kagawad) of the Sangguniang Bayan or town council, alongside a secretary to the said council, all of which are elected to a three-year term and are eligible to run for three consecutive terms. As of 30 June 2022, Banton's incumbent mayor is Milagros "Mely" Faderanga of the Nacionalista Party while the incumbent Vice Mayor is James F. Fadrilan, also of the Nacionalista Party.

The barangays or villages, meanwhile, are headed by elected officials, the topmost being the Punong Barangay or the Barangay Chairperson (addressed as Kapitan; also known as the Barangay Captain). The Kapitan is aided by the Sangguniang Barangay (Barangay Council) whose members, called Barangay Kagawad (Councilors), are also elected. The barangays have SK federation which represents the barangay, headed by SK chairperson and whose members are called SK councilors. All officials are also elected every three years.

In 2011 and 2013, Banton was a recipient of the Seal of Good Housekeeping from the Department of the Interior and Local Government (DILG). As recipient of the award, the local government was rewarded with one million pesos from the Performance Challenge Fund of the DILG for use in local projects. The Seal of Good Housekeeping is a mechanism which tracks the performance of local government units, "specifically in the areas of local legislation, development planning, resource generation, and resource allocation".

=== Municipal seal ===
Banton's municipal seal

The municipal seal of Banton is composed of two concentric circles: a thin yellow outer circle and a small white circle. The yellow outer circle has the words Bayan ng Banton (Municipality of Banton) written on top in a semi-circular fashion and the words Lalawigan ng Romblon (Province of Romblon) on the bottom in a semi-circular fashion. At the center of the small white circle is a shield with five grey sides, a motif taken from the Provincial Seal of Romblon. The shield has a light blue field representing the Sibuyan Sea where the island municipality is located.

At the center of the light blue field is an outline map of the island in green. Two figures can also be seen on the seal: A coconut tree on the center of the outline of the island, representing copra, the island's major crop and economic activity, which als' symbolizes the Bantoanons' desire to live a decent life and gain greater knowledge for a brighter tomorrow. On light blue field to left of the outline of the island is an image of a wooden ship, locally known lanson, as the Bantoanons are skilled shipbuilders. It also symbolizes their desire to seek adventure and greener pastures.

== Infrastructure ==
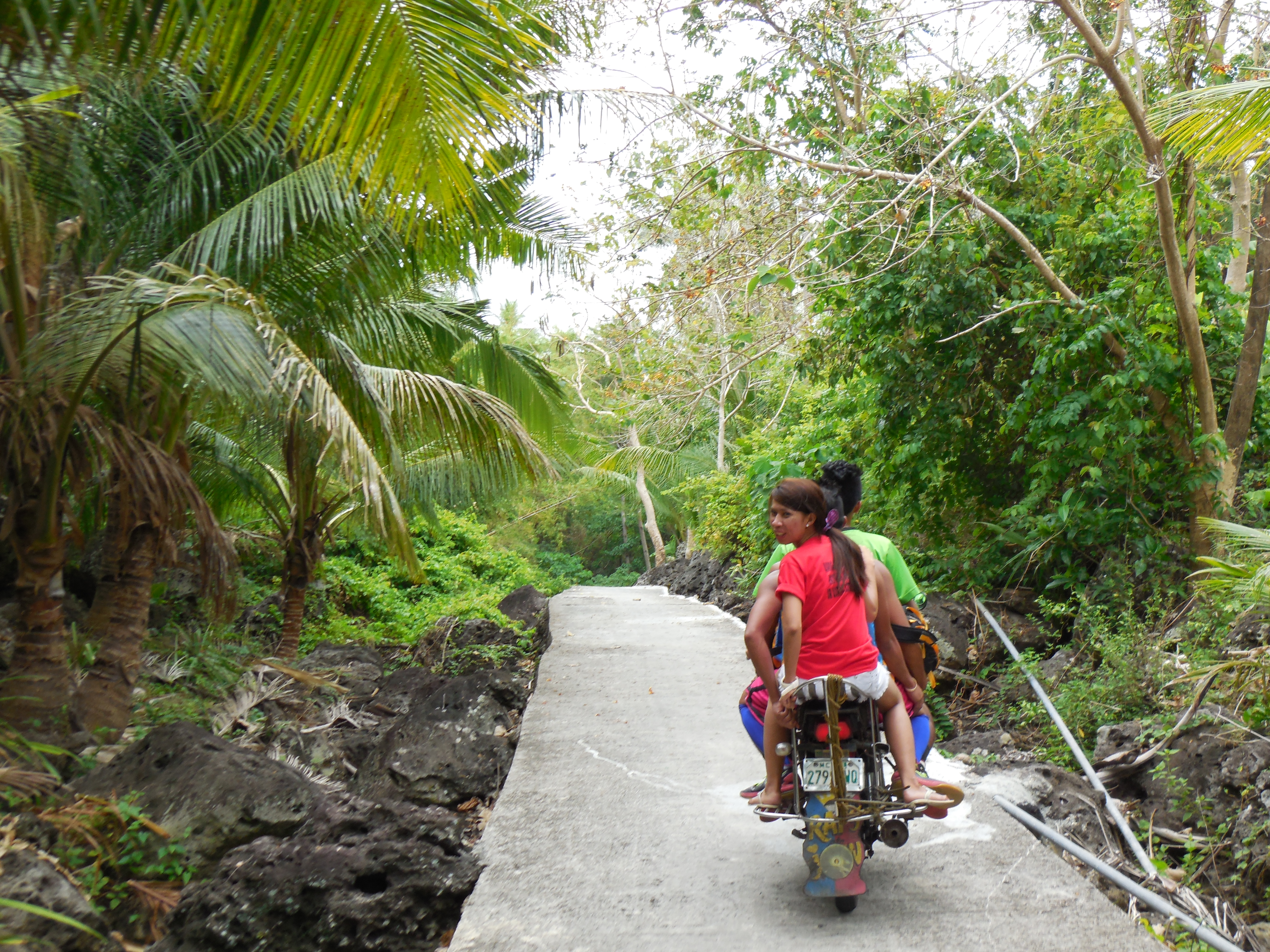
Motorcycle taxis are the main mode of transportation in Banton.

=== Utilities ===
Electricity in the island is supplied by a 0.326 MW diesel power plant of the Romblon Electric Cooperative (ROMELCO). Electricity service used to be available only in early morning, from 4:00 to 6:00 a.m. and at night, from 5:00 to 11:00 p.m., due to limited fuel supplies. On 16 March 2018, ROMELCO began supplying the island with 24-hour electricity. On 1 September 2024, ROMELCO was granted, by virtue of Republic Act No. 12020, which was sponsored by Sen. Risa Hontiveros, a 25-year expansion of its franchise to construct, install, establish, operate, own, manage, and maintain power supply and distribution systems in Banton, as well as in the neighboring island municipalities of Corcuera and Concepcion.

Water is being supplied through a level-one water system installed by the Department of Social Welfare and Development (DSWD) through its Kapit-Bisig Laban sa Kahirapan-Comprehensive and Integrated Delivery of Social Services (Kalahi CIDDS) initiative in 2015. The water is sourced from underground freshwater springs in Barangay Mainit and distributed to individual homes through a network of pipes and pumps. Aside from this system, locals also get potable water from artesian wells built in several locations in the island and rainwater collection systems that many residents have in their homes.

The island has access to cellular phone and Internet service through Smart and Globe. Terrestrial and cable television service are also available.

=== Transportation ===
As seas surrounding Banton can be rough during the wet season, the best time to visit the island is from March to May during the dry (summer) season. This is also the typical time for Asi families living in Metro Manila or abroad to visit the island since it coincides with the Lenten season and barangay fiestas. Within the island, the main forms of transportation are passenger motorcycles (known elsewhere as habal-habal) and motorized boats. A circumferential road connects the 17 barangays of Banton to each other.

By sea: Banton is accessible via RORO vessels, wooden launches and motorized boats that regularly travel from Lucena City, Quezon. A RORO ferry by Starhorse Shipping leaves for Banton at 4 p.m. every Sunday, Tuesday, and Thursday and returns to Lucena City from Banton at 5 p.m. every Monday, Wednesday, and Friday. Tourists and visitors can also take RORO vessels that ply the Manila-Odiongan, Batangas City-Odiongan, or the Roxas-Odiongan route. From Odiongan, Banton can be reached by jeepney and motorized boat via Calatrava, Romblon. Another alternative route is through Pinamalayan, Oriental Mindoro using motorized boats.

By air: The closest airport with active airline service is Godofredo P. Ramos Airport in Malay, Aklan. From the airport, travelers can take a tricycle to the Caticlan Jetty Port where they can book a ticket for a RORO ferry going to Odiongan, Romblon. Upon arriving at Odiongan, travellers can ride passenger vans to San Agustin, Romblon where they can book another ticket for a RORO ferry going to Lucena, Quezon, which stops in Banton in the afternoon.

== Healthcare ==
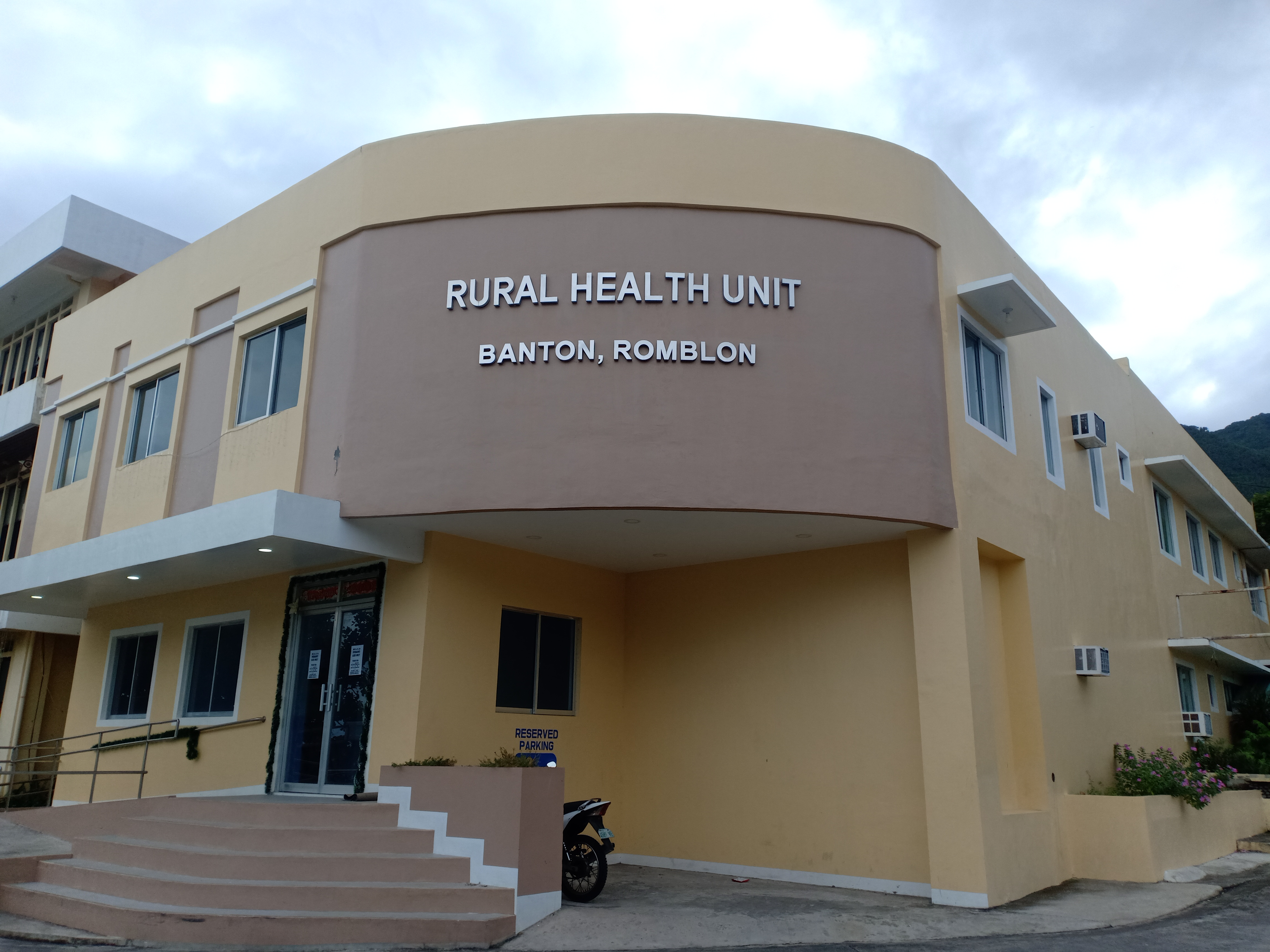
The building of the Banton Rural Health Unit in Barangay Poblacion.

Banton has a rural health unit located beside the town hall and town square in Barangay Poblacion that can provide basic healthcare services to its residents. Aside from this, there are barangays that have a health center that provide healthcare monitoring, first aid, and other basic healthcare services. For more severe medical emergencies and other medical tests, patients need to be transported to Romblon, Odiongan, or Lucena to receive healthcare services.

== Education ==
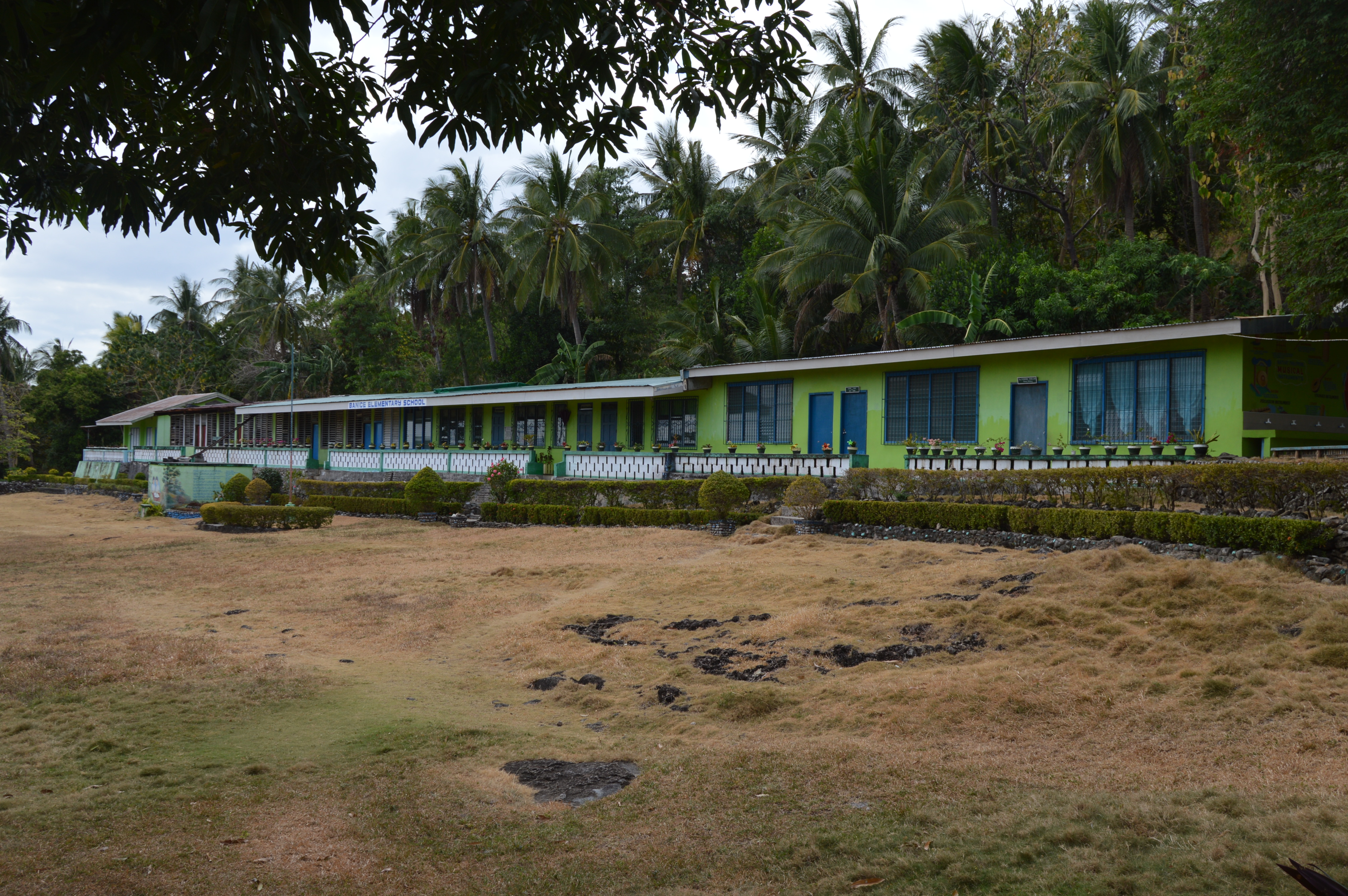
Banice Elementary School

The Banton Schools District Office governs all educational institutions within the municipality. It oversees the management and operations of all private and public, from primary to secondary schools.

Banton has a high literacy rate owing to the establishment of several public elementary and secondary schools. All schools in the island are administered by the Department of Education (DepEd). The main public elementary school, Banton Central School, and the main secondary school, Banton National High School, are both located in the main village of Poblacion. There are public elementary schools as well in the villages of Balogo, Banice, Libtong, Nasunogan, Tan-ag, Tungonan, and Tumalum (shared with the village of Lagang). Another secondary school, Tungonan National High School, is located in Tungonan.

=== Primary and elementary schools ===
- Balogo Elementary School
- Banice Elementary School
- Banton Central Elementary School
- Libtong Elementary School
- Nasunogan Elementary School
- Tan-ag Elementary School
- Tumalum-Lagang Elementary School
- Tungonan Elementary School

=== Secondary schools ===
- Banton National High School
- Tungonan National High School

== Notable personalities ==
- Gabriel Fabella, co-founder and first president of the Philippine Historical Association; Father of June 12 Independence Day; and sole representative of Romblon in the First National Assembly (1935–1938).
- Buenaventura Famadico, fourth Bishop of the Roman Catholic Diocese of San Pablo in Laguna, and second Bishop of the Roman Catholic Diocese of Gumaca in Quezon Province.

== Gallery ==
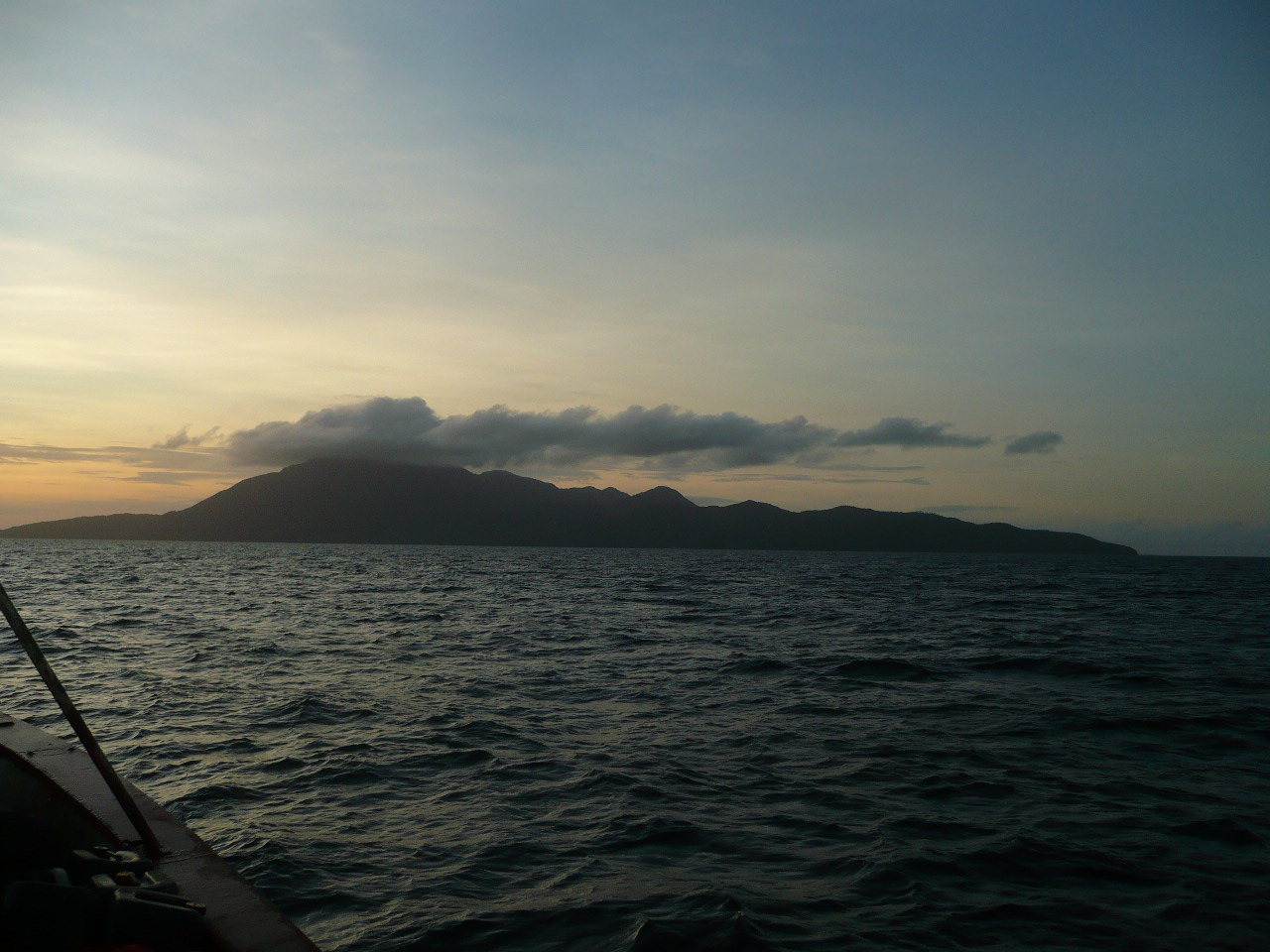
Banton Island in the Sibuyan Sea

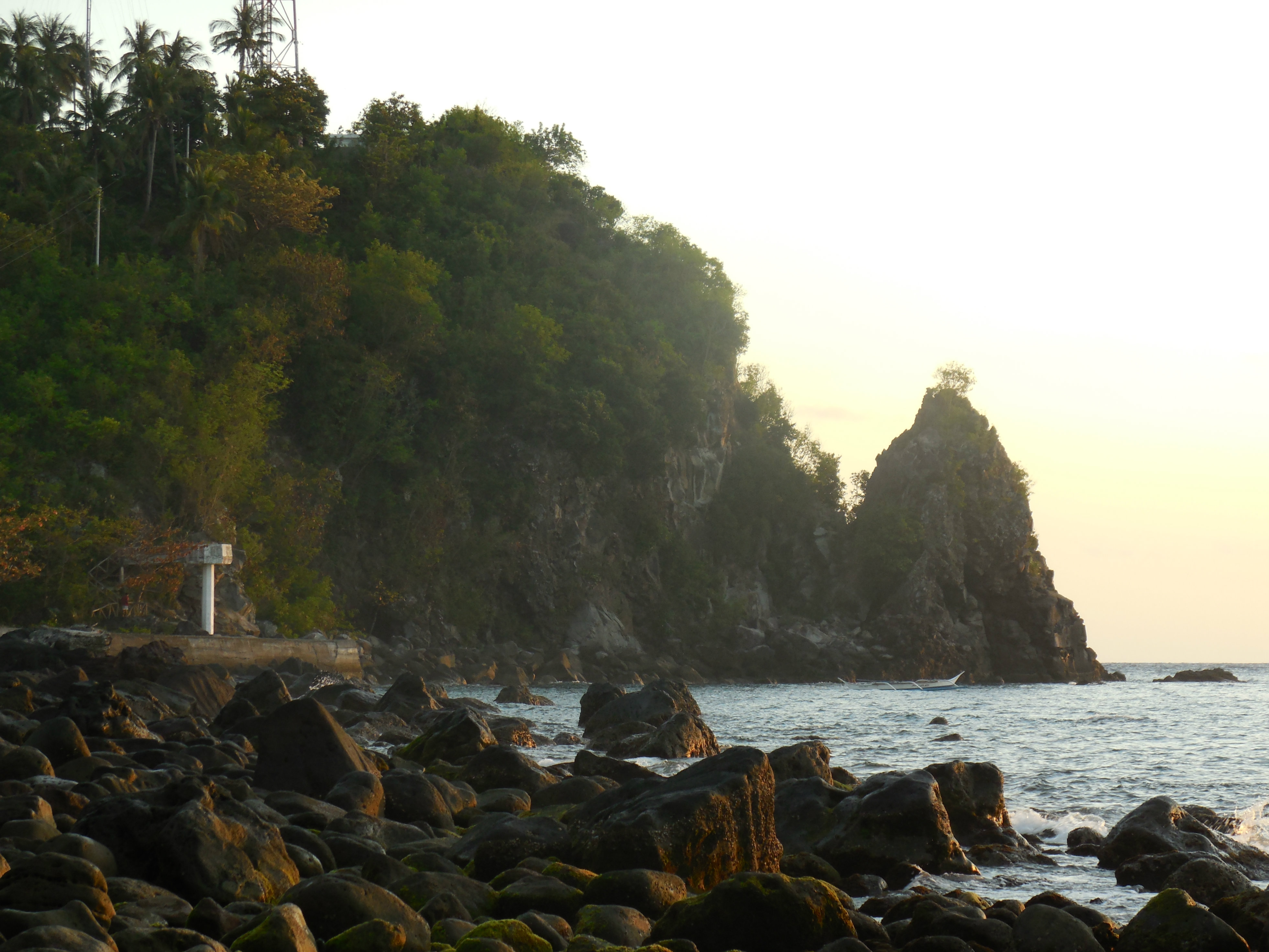
Punta Matagar rock formation

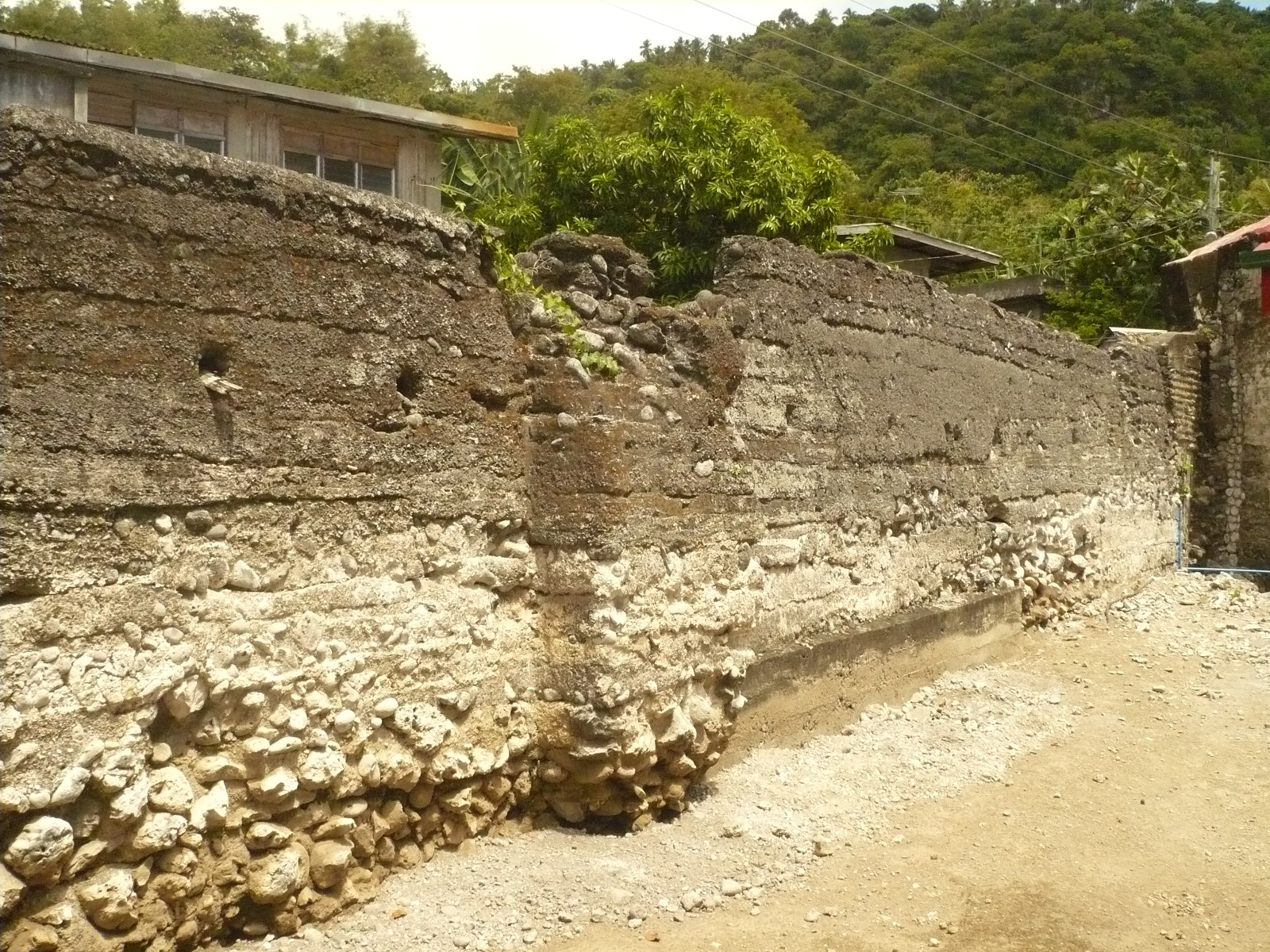
The 15th-century limestone walls of Fuerza de San Jose

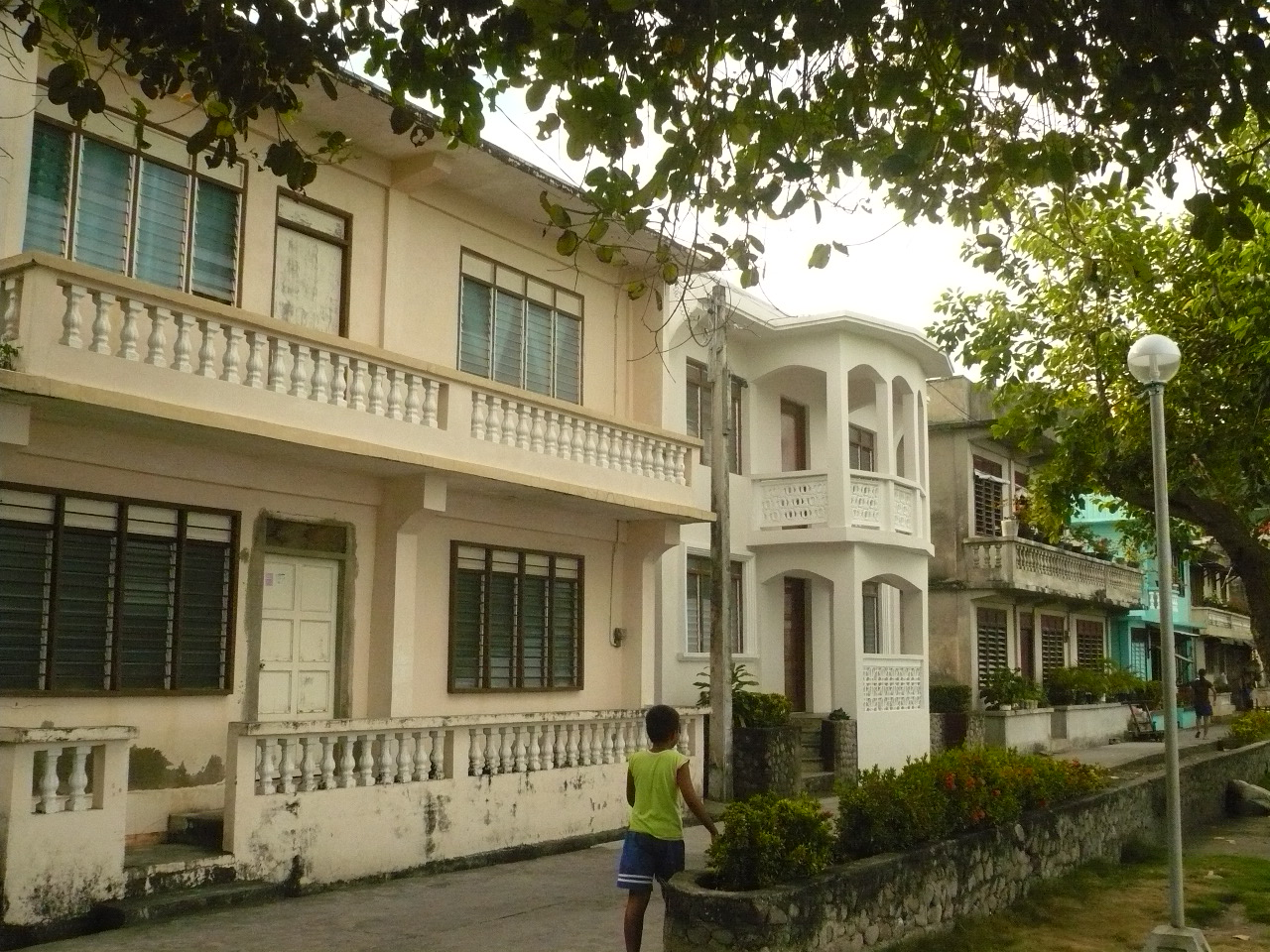
Heritage houses along Banton's seawall

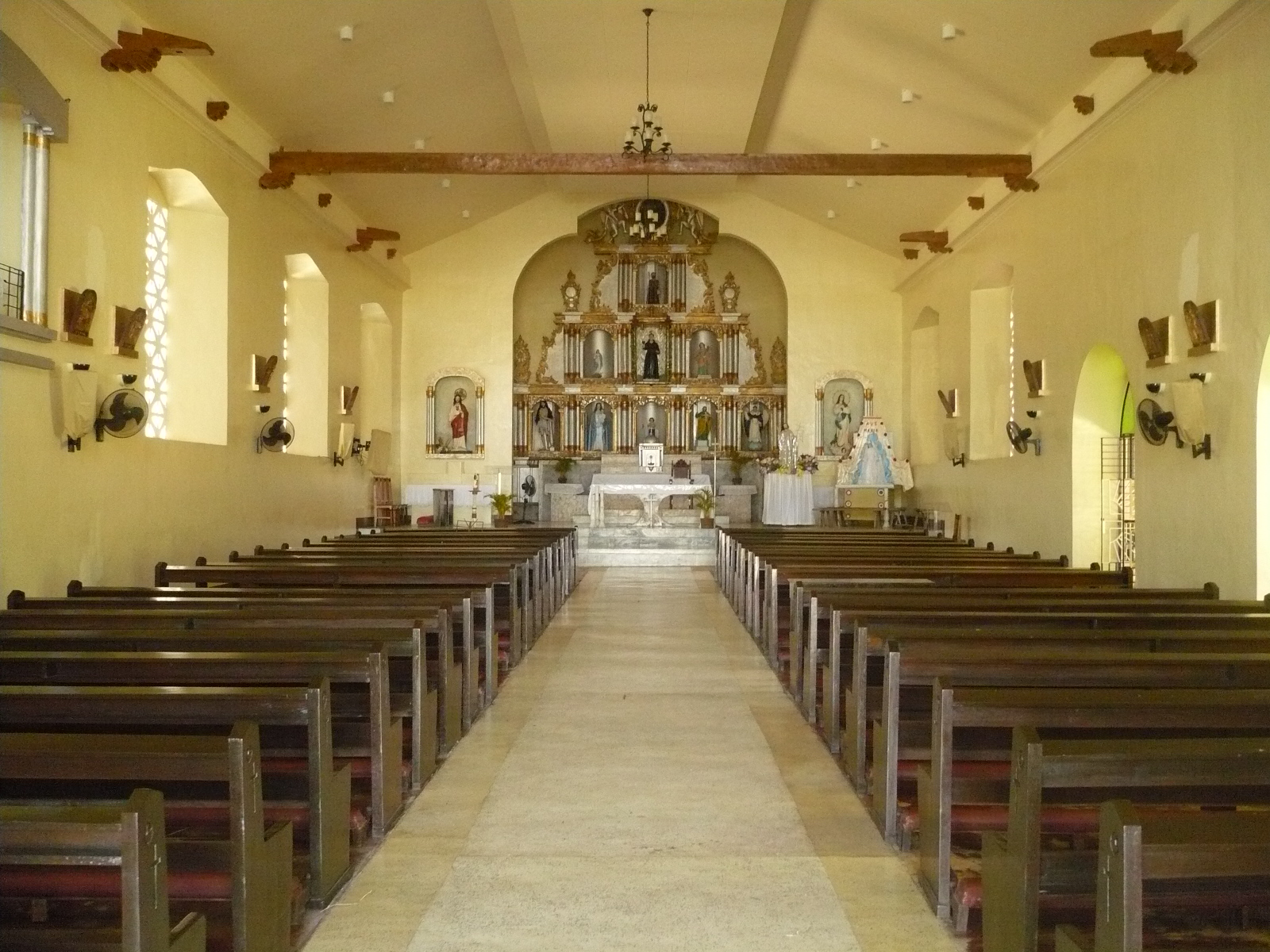
The interior of the San Nicolas de Tolentino Parish Church

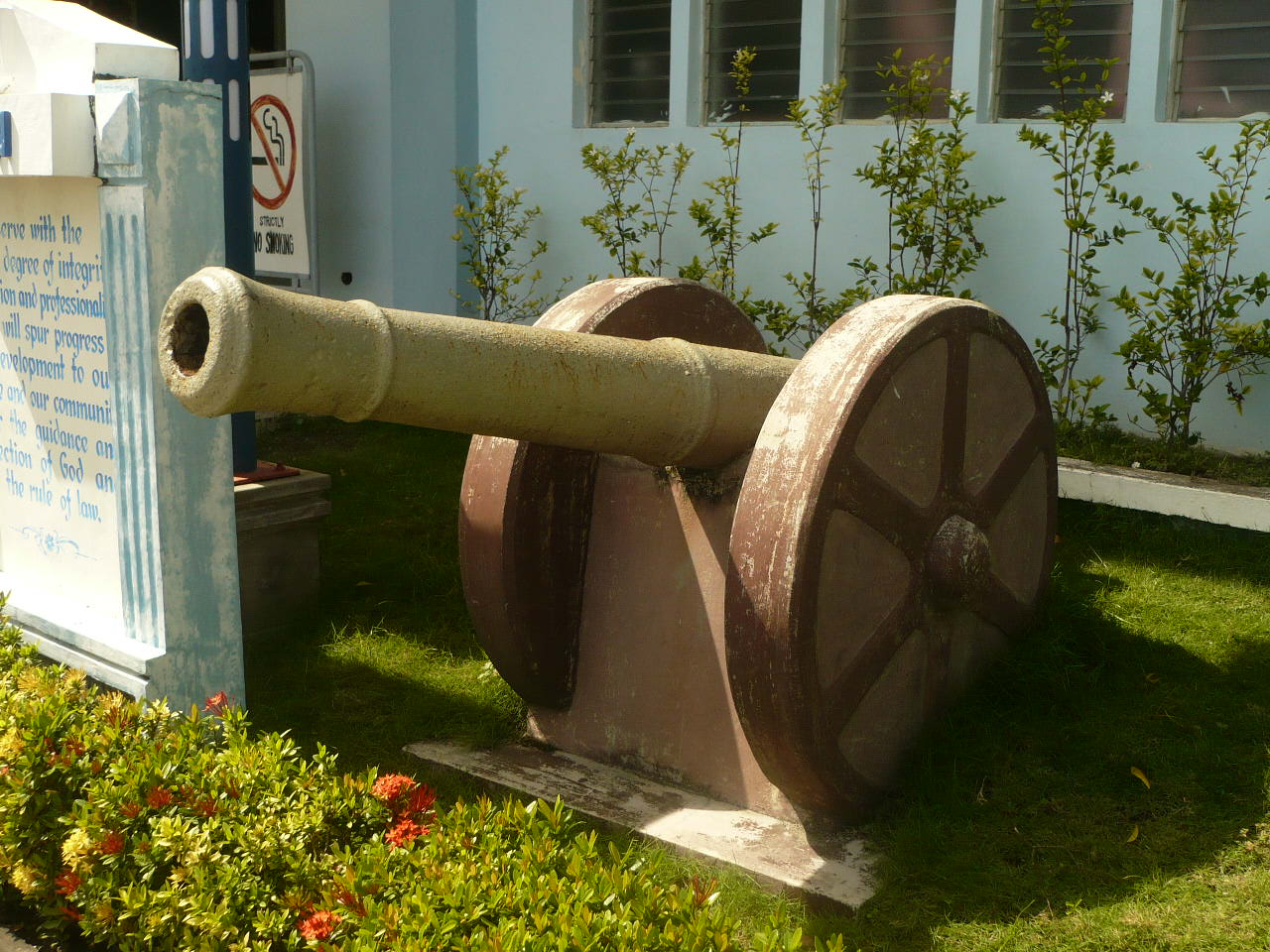
A Spanish era cannon in front of the Banton Civic Center

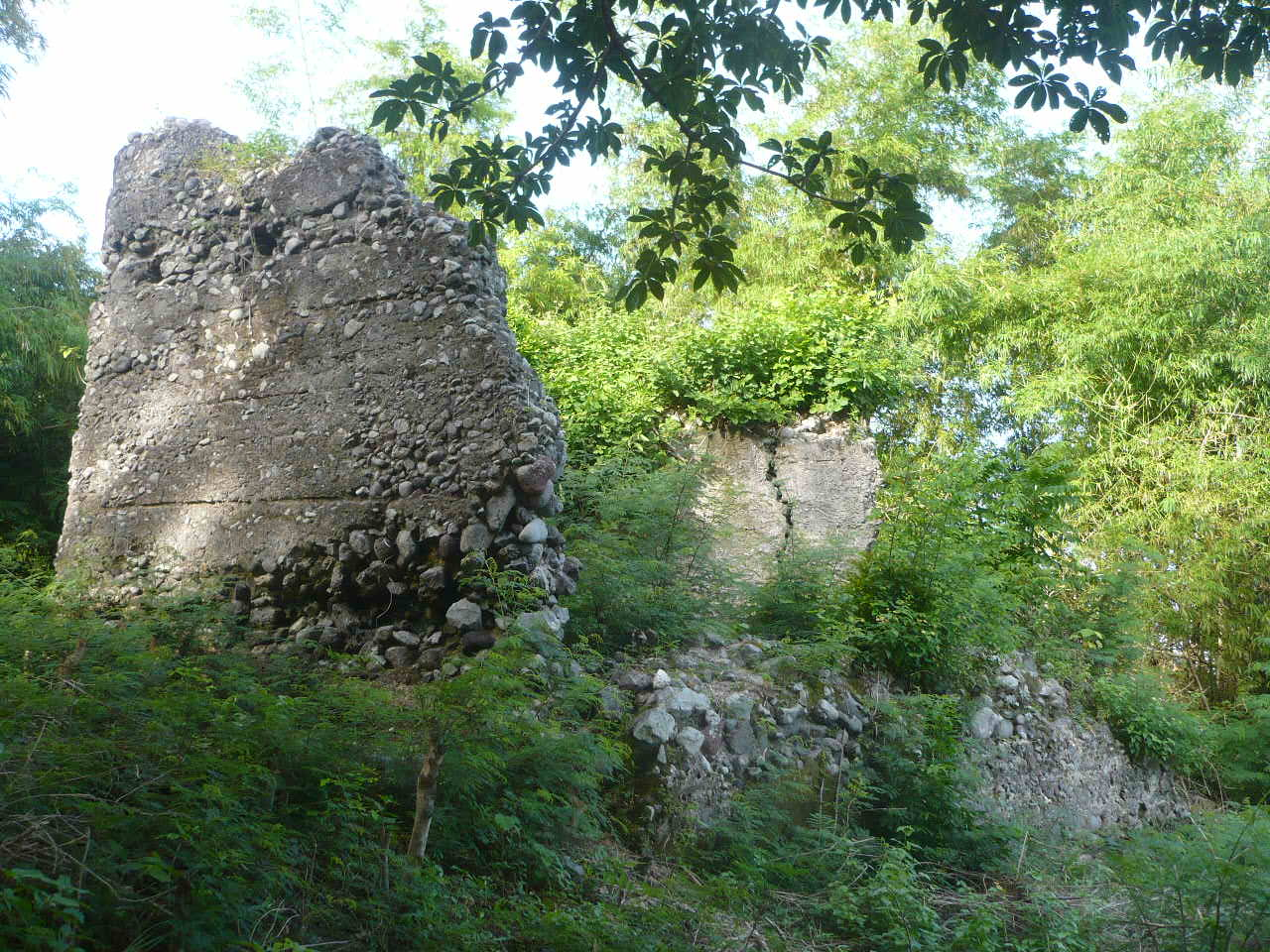
Ruins of an old Spanish era watchtower in barrio Onti
