= San Carlos Cathedral (Negros Occidental) =

Roman Catholic church in Negros Occidental, Philippines

- San Carlos Borromeo Cathedral Parish
- Parokyang Katedral ni San Carlos Borromeo (Filipino); Parroquia Catedral de San Carlos Borromeo (Spanish)
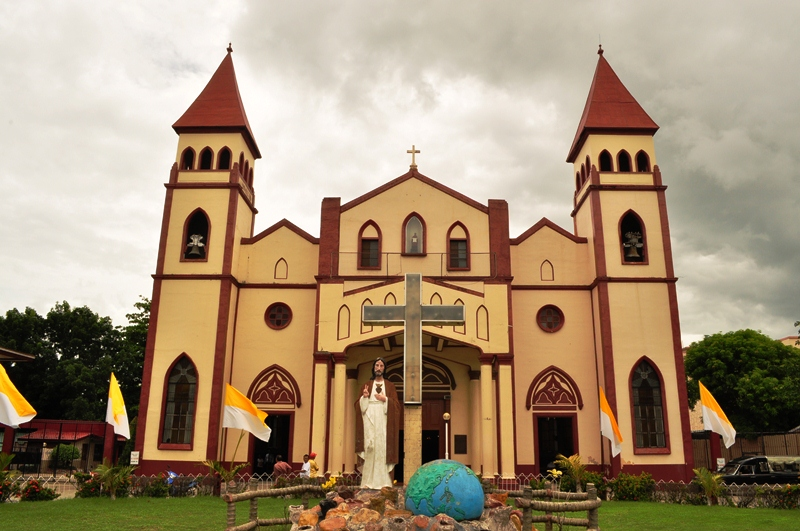
- Cathedral facade in 2013

- Location in the Visayas Location in the Philippines
- 10°28′53″N 123°25′06″E
- Location: San Carlos, Negros Occidental
- Country: Philippines
- Denomination: Roman Catholic

History
- Status: Cathedral
- Founded: 1892
- Dedication: Charles Borromeo
- Consecrated: 1892, 1935

Architecture
- Functional status: Active
- Architectural type: Church building
- Style: Eclectic
- Groundbreaking: 1928
- Completed: 1935

Administration
- Province: Jaro
- Metropolis: Jaro
- Diocese: San Carlos

Clergy
- Bishop: Gerardo Alimane Alminaza

San Carlos Borromeo Cathedral Parish, commonly known as San Carlos Cathedral, is a 20th-century Eclectic Roman Catholic cathedral parish dedicated to Saint Charles Borromeo, located in San Carlos, Negros Occidental, Philippines. In 1987, it became the cathedral of the Diocese of San Carlos which comprises northeastern Negros Occidental and northern Negros Oriental.

== History ==
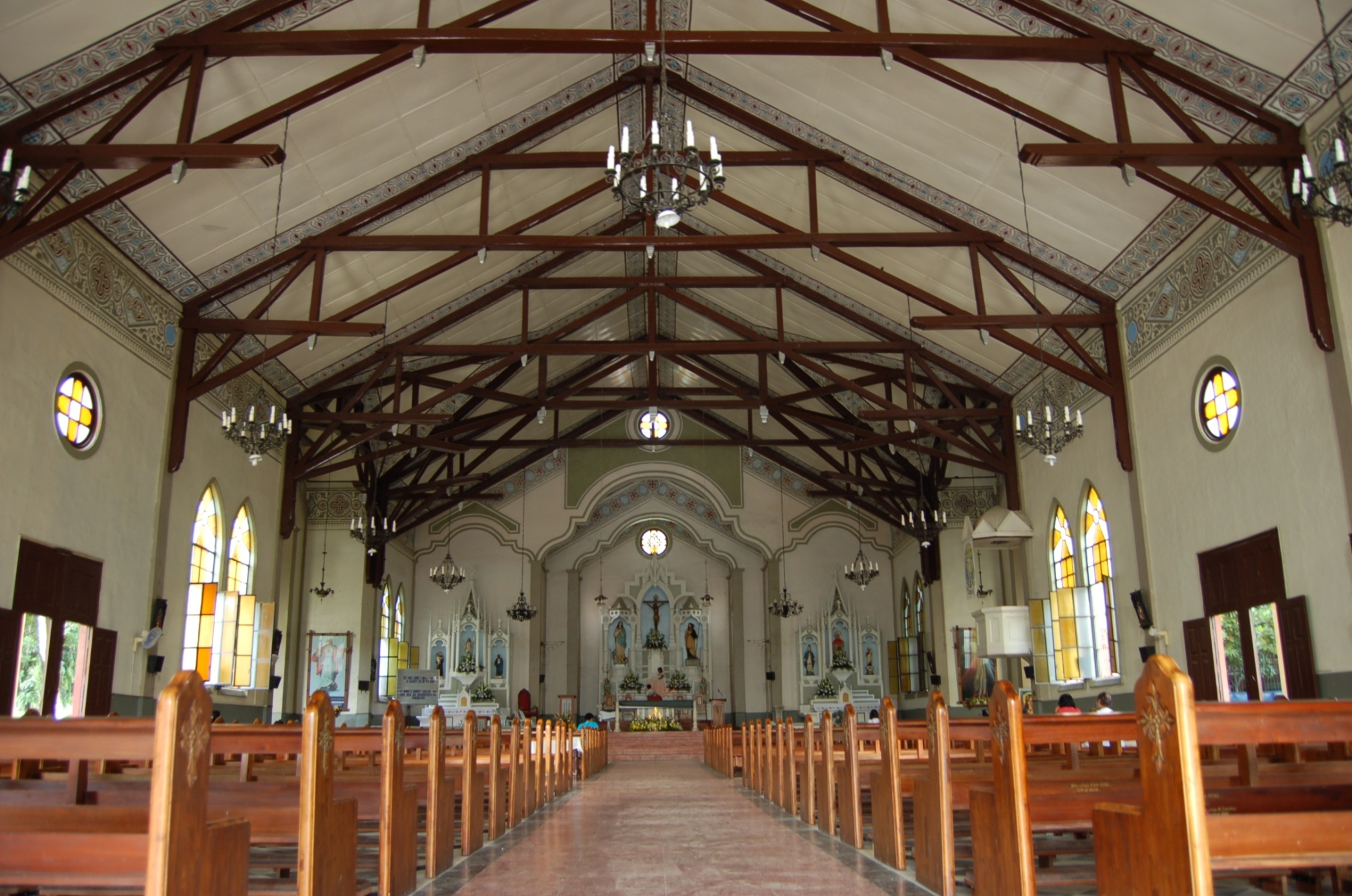
Cathedral interior

The city of San Carlos was once a small Negrito community area named Nabingkalan. In 1856, the said settlement was renamed San Carlos and was made a pueblo by the Spanish government. San Carlos received its first parish priest in 1892, appointed by the Bishop of Jaro.

The groundbreaking and construction of the church of San Carlos begun under the leadership of Fr. Leoncio Reta in 1928. Lack of funds, however, caused delay in the construction of the solid foundation and a few meters of the walls. Fr. Manuel Gomara wanted no more delay in the construction of the church and so in May 1935, he sought the help of the hacenderos of San Carlos: the Gamboas, Broces, Llantadas, and the Menchacas. Don Julio Ledesma eventually donated ₱20,000 for the construction project after the initial ₱12,000 budget was deemed insufficient. The construction of the church thereafter resumed. Dr. Cerada drew the blueprint of the church, and its construction was supervised by architect Angel Locsin Yulo. The finished church was consecrated and inaugurated on Saint Charles Borromeo's feast day in 1935. It is 51 metres (167 feet) long and 22 metres (72 feet) wide, and was built in eclectic style, comprising Gothic, Byzantine and Romanesque architectural features.
