= Maximiana in Numidia =

Maximiana in Numidia was an Ancient city and bishopric in Roman Africa and remains a Latin Catholic titular see.

Its presumed location are the ruins of Mexmeia, in present Algeria.

== History ==
Maximiana was important enough in the Roman province of Numidia to become one of its Metropolitan's many suffragan bishoprics, but was to fade.

The diocese was nominally restored in 1925 as the titular bishopric of Maximiana, renamed in 1933 Maximiana in Numidia.

It has had the following incumbents, of the lowest (episcopal) rank, except a single archiepiscopal (intermediary rank) :

- Gustave-Joseph Deswazières (祝福#, Paris Foreign Missions Society (M.E.P.) (1928.02.18 – 1946.04.11)
- Enrique María Dubuc Moreno (1947.11.17 – 1962.06.22), as emeritate; previously Titular Bishop of Zaraï (1926.05.25 – 1926.09.26# & Coadjutor Bishop of Barquisimeto (Venezuela) (1926.05.25 – 1926.09.26), succeeding as Bishop of Barquisimeto (1926.09.26 – 1947.11.17);
- Ramón Munita Eyzaguirre (1963.04.23 – 1970.12.22)
- Joseph Jean Marie Rozier (1971.05.10 – 1973.04.11)
- Titular Archbishop Emilio Benavent Escuín (1977.05.25 – 1998.03.07), as emeritate; previously Titular Bishop of Cercina (1954.12.06 – 1967.04.07) & Auxiliary Bishop of Málaga (Spain) (1954.12.06 – 1967.04.07), succeeded ad Bishop of Málaga (1967.04.07 – 1968.08.26), then Titular Archbishop of Tiburnia (1968.08.26 – 1974.02.03) & Coadjutor Archbishop of Granada (Spain) (1968.08.26 – 1974.02.03), succeeded as Metropolitan Archbishop of Granada (1974.02.03 – 1977.05.25), Archbishop Military Vicar of Spain (Spain) (1977.05.25 – 1982.10.27)
- Joseph Mugenyi Sabiiti (1999.01.02 – ...), Auxiliary Bishop of Fort Portal (Uganda)

== See also ==
- Maximianae
- Maximiana in Byzacena
- Maximiana in Byzacena
- Maximianopolis (disambiguation)
