= San Carlos, Negros Occidental =

Component city in the Philippines

San Carlos
- Component city
- City of San Carlos
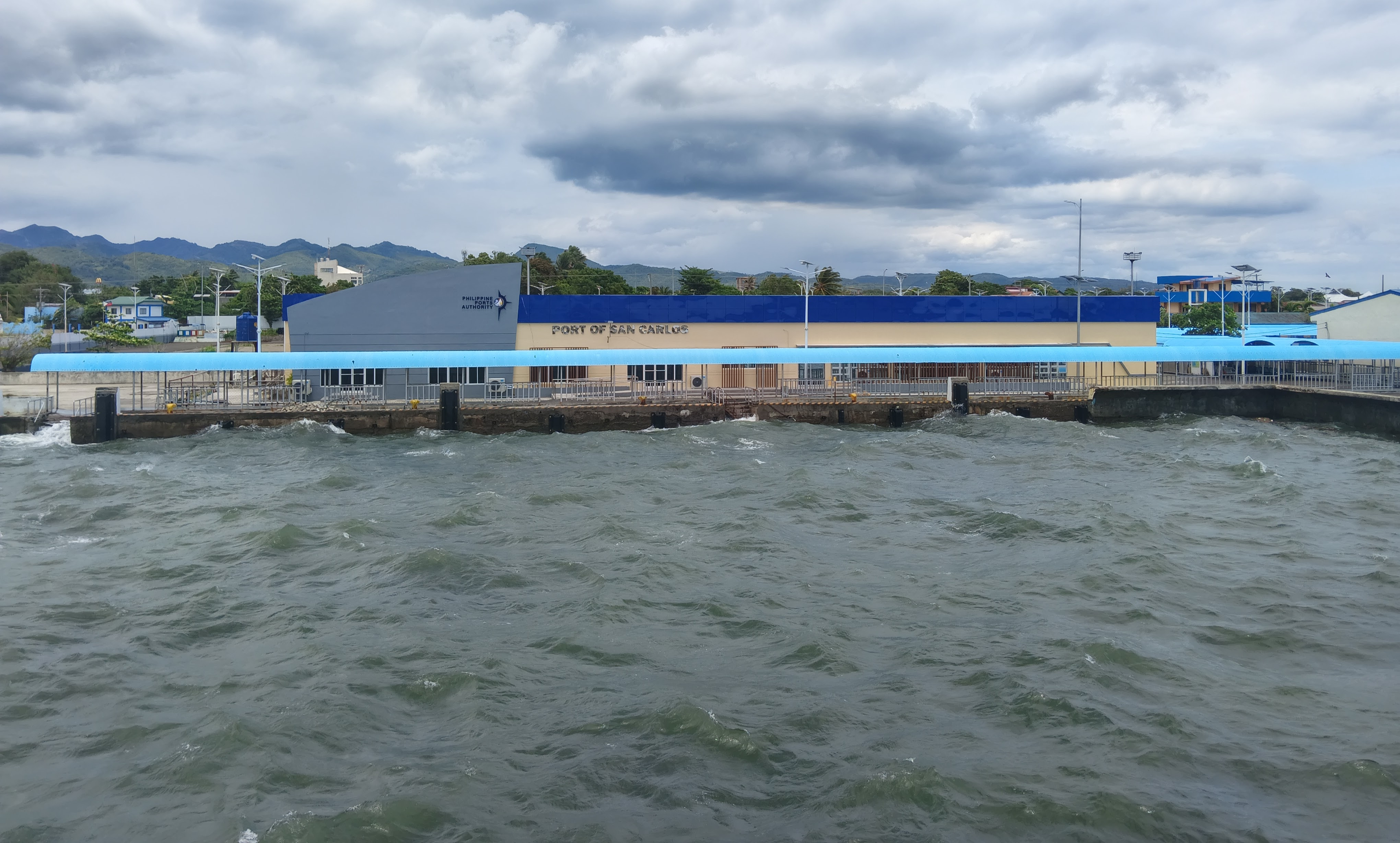
- Port of San Carlos

- Flag Seal
- Nickname: Renewable Energy Hub of Asia
- Motto: "¡Vamos, San Carlos!"
- Anthem: "Mutyang Dakbayan"
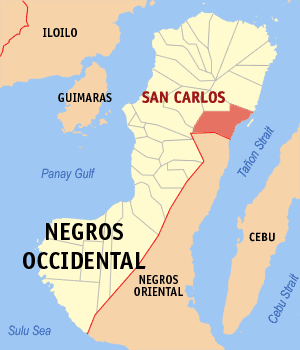
- Map of Negros Occidental with San Carlos highlighted
- Interactive map of San Carlos
- Location within the Philippines
- Coordinates: 10°29′35″N 123°24′34″E
- Country: Philippines
- Region: Negros Island Region
- Province: Negros Occidental
- District: 1st district
- Founded: 1898
- Cityhood: July 1, 1960
- Named for: St. Charles Borromeo
- Barangays: 18 (see Barangays)

Government
  - Type: Sangguniang Panlungsod
  - Mayor: Renato Y. Gustilo (NPC)
  - Vice Mayor: Christopher Paul S. Carmona (NPC)
  - Representative: Julio A. Ledesma IV (NPC)
  - City Council: Members: Gerardo W. Valmayor III; Rommel T. Debulgado; Armando L. Laguda, Jr.; Carlos Manuel L. Valmayor; Joseph Mark A. Antonio; Victoriana C. Cabili; Philip Gerard B. Maisog; Jonie S. Uy; Arthur A. Batomalaque; Jeffrey M. Hidalgo; Mary Dawn P. Cañetan ^{◌}; ◌ ex officio SK chairman
  - Electorate: 87,107 voters (2025)

Area
  - Total: 451.50 km^{2} (174.33 sq mi)
- Elevation: 456 m (1,496 ft)
- Highest elevation: 2,427 m (7,963 ft)
- Lowest elevation: 0 m (0 ft)

Population (2024 census)
  - Total: 133,175
  - Density: 294.96/km^{2} (763.95/sq mi)
  - Households: 33,623
- Demonym(s): San Carloseño (masculine); San Carloseña (feminine)

Economy
  - Income class: 1st city income class
  - Poverty incidence: 29.05% (2023)
  - Revenue: ₱ 1,681 million (2024)
  - Assets: ₱ 5,171 million (2024)
  - Expenditure: ₱ 582.1 million (2024)
  - Liabilities: ₱ 998.5 million (2024)

Service provider
  - Electricity: Northern Negros Electric Cooperative (NONECO)
- Time zone: UTC+8 (PST)
- ZIP code: 6127
- PSGC: 064524000
- IDD : area code: +63 (0)34
- Native languages: Hiligaynon; Cebuano; Tagalog
- Website: www.sancarloscity.gov.ph

San Carlos, officially the City of San Carlos (Cebuano: Dakbayan sa San Carlos; Hiligaynon: Dakbanwa/Syudad sang San Carlos; Filipino: Lungsod ng San Carlos), is a component city in the province of Negros Occidental in the Philippines. According to the 2024 census, it has a population of 133,175 people.

== History ==
=== Pre-Spanish and Spanish colonization ===
San Carlos City was formerly named Nabingkalan, deriving its name from Nabingka, the daughter of a chieftain of the Negrito settlement in the area, who ruled the barrio during the early part of the 17th century. She was famous for her loveliness and mental and physical prowess. After her death, the people mourned for two years, and to perpetuate her memory, named the barrio after her. The settlement was later bought by Carlos Apurado from Badian, Cebu, who with the help of fellow pioneers developed the settlement into a thriving Christian village. In 1856, Buglas (Negros) Island, as a politico-military province under the Spanish Empire, was divided into two provinces, west Negros under Iloilo and east Negros under Cebu. Nabingkalan was under the jurisdiction of Calatrava municipality in Iloilo. Don Emilio Saravia, the first political-military governor in the island during the Spanish era, renamed the barrio and established it as a pueblo.

A mission belonging to the municipality of Calatrava was created in 1895, although since 1891 a religious had been assigned to it. The number of inhabitants at the time was 1,100, living in the mountainous areas rather than the coast where the modern village is located. Father Pedro Chivite was assigned to the mission. It was vacated during the Revolution, and in 1904 Father Eusebio Valderrama took charge of it. With the help of Fathers Ángel Quintana, Juan Lorenzo, and Vicente Vázquez, all the towns of the coast from Guihulngan to Escalante were attended to. Since then, it has been administered to by the Fathers. According to a church chronicle from 1925, what was a poor and depopulated village in 1897 was by then one of the most important towns in Negros Occidental. In that year, the city had an estimated population of 30,000. The land began to be cultivated when a Spaniard who observed the fertility of the land built a small sugarcane farm. Seeing the good results obtained, others joined in cultivating the land, modern machines were installed, and it became one of the most productive villages on the island. In 1889 there were four estates and in 1897 there were 16, mainly owned by Spaniards.

In 1856 Negros was raised to the category of a politico-military province, Saravia being its first governor. It was during his term that several towns of Negros Occidental, including San Isido, San Carlos, and Calatrava were established.

San Carlos prospered through the years, however the village lost its pueblo status in 1890, when Negros Island was divided into Negros Occidental and Negros Oriental, and the village was recorded as an arrabal or barrio of Calatrava (Hilub-ang).

=== American colonization ===
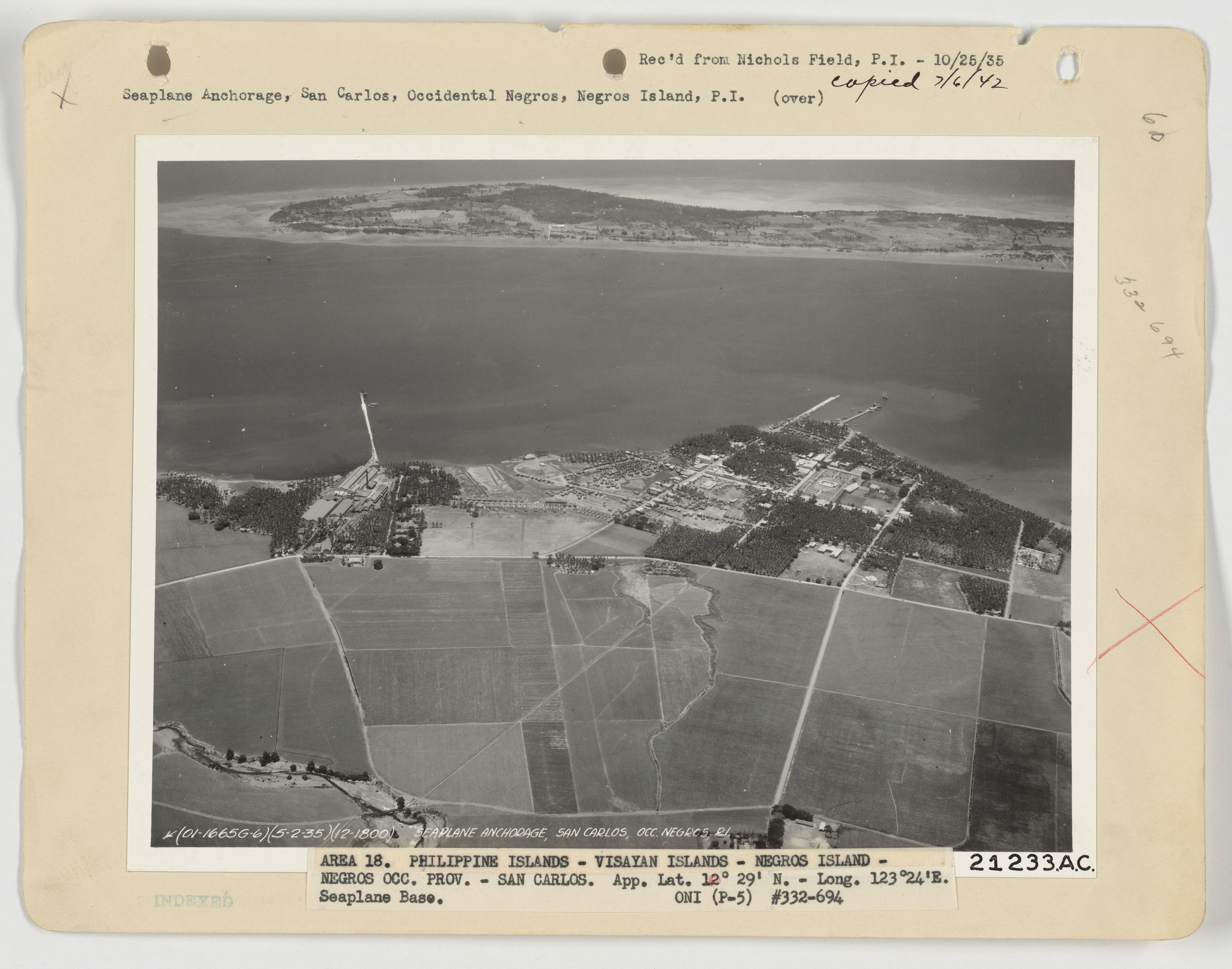
Aerial view of San Carlos, 1935

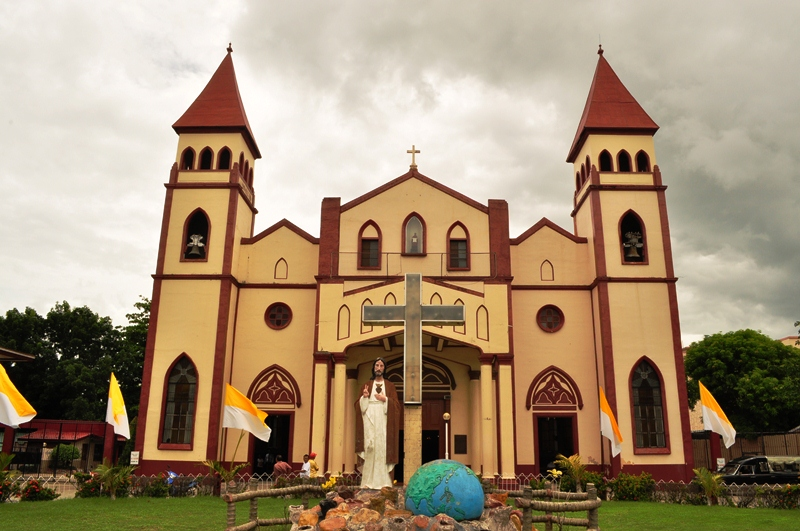
The San Carlos Borromeo Cathedral in San Carlos, built during the American period

During the first years of the American occupation of the Philippines, the economic and social pace of the activities of the people were gauged by the movements of the large landholders and Spaniards in the lowlands. In 1903, Filipinos were first allowed to elect their own leaders. In 1912, when a sugar central was constructed, the economic life of the people was greatly enhanced. Political activities, however, were closely connected to Calatrava until 1925, when it was organized into a municipality.

San Carlos Milling Company of San Carlos erected one of the first and only modern sugarcane mills in the Philippines, and has engaged in sugarcane cultivation and sugar production. The capacity of the mill is 1000 tons of cane per day, which results in 125 tons of centrifugal sugar. It was completed at the end of 1913 at a cost of about one million dollars, and the first cane ground was from the 1914 crop.

Per a 1903 act of the Philippine Commission, the municipality consisted of its present territory and that of Calatrava's, with the seat of the municipal government at San Carlos.

In 1920, the municipality comprised the barrios Antabayan, Cubay, Euzcasa, Looc, Malalamban, San Juan, Santa Filomena, Sitio Banatic, Tigbon, and Varconia.

World War I encouraged the people of San Carlos to grow more sugar-producing crops. After the armistice in 1917, the planters who produced more sugar had their wealth greatly increased because of the new price of sugar never before enjoyed by the planters. During the war, many men of the municipality volunteered to fight for the United States, but a few months later were sent back home because of the armistice.

=== World War II ===
San Carlos was actively involved on the war efforts against Imperial Japan during World War II. A month after the surrender of Negros to the Japanese Imperial Forces, the guerrilla movement began in San Carlos and Calatrava. As early as June 15, 1942, guerilla units under the leadership of Captain Eugenio Antonio, Jr. and Lieutenants Leonardo Marane and Alfredo Valdivia, assisted by Philippine Commonwealth Army soldiers, began operations against the Japanese. Pitched battles were fought within populated areas. Despite the presence of the U.S. forces under Major Edward McClenahan, separate guerrilla units were scattered in the area under different commanders as they were unable to effectively establish a formal chain-of-command among the different factions.

Upon the return of some local USAFFE officers to San Carlos, the guerrilla movement was formally organized into fighting units under USAFFE Captains Catalino D. Rivera, Eugenio Antonio, Jr. and Loreto Y. Apuhin Sr., and with Lieutenants Florencio C. Yap and Andres L. Arrogante, the bands of guerrillas in San Carlos were consolidated under one command. Young men in their early teens joined the ranks and fought face-to-face against the Japanese.

In March 1945, the Philippine Commonwealth forces under the 7th, 71st and 72nd Infantry Division of the Philippine Commonwealth Army, 7th Infantry Regiment of the Philippine Constabulary and local guerrilla units under the command of Colonel Ernesto Mata, attacked the Japanese garrison in the compound of San Carlos Milling Company and succeeded in driving away the Japanese Army, at the cost of the life of Lt. Valdivia.

On October 10, 1945, President Sergio Osmeña appointed Eugenio Antonio as Acting Mayor of San Carlos and Anacleto Facturan as Acting Vice Mayor.

Former President Manuel A. Roxas appointed Constancio Rabacal as Mayor and Fausto Caballero as Vice Mayor of San Carlos on June 13, 1946.

Dionisio Gajo was appointed as a councilor of the city on September 9, 1946.

Juan Broce was appointed Vice Mayor of the city on June 7, 1947.

Eufronio Dolino, Juan Broce, Victorino G. Apuhin, Carlos Jones, Alfredo Rivera, Feliciano Gauzon Fermin de la Victoria and Hipolito Rigor were appointed Councilors of the city on June 10, 1946.

=== Post-war period ===
The first post-war election in the municipality resulted in a Liberal government. In the 1953 elections, the Nacionalista Party wrested power from the Liberals.

==== Cityhood ====
The municipality's status was elevated to city on July 1, 1960, per Republic Act No. 2643 and Presidential Proclamation No. 685 s. 1960.

By Virtue of Republic Act No. 2643, the Municipality of San Carlos was converted into a city on July 1, 1960. The city inherited from the municipality numerous improvements, introduced by the last municipal administration under Mayor Sofronio Carmona.

== Geography ==
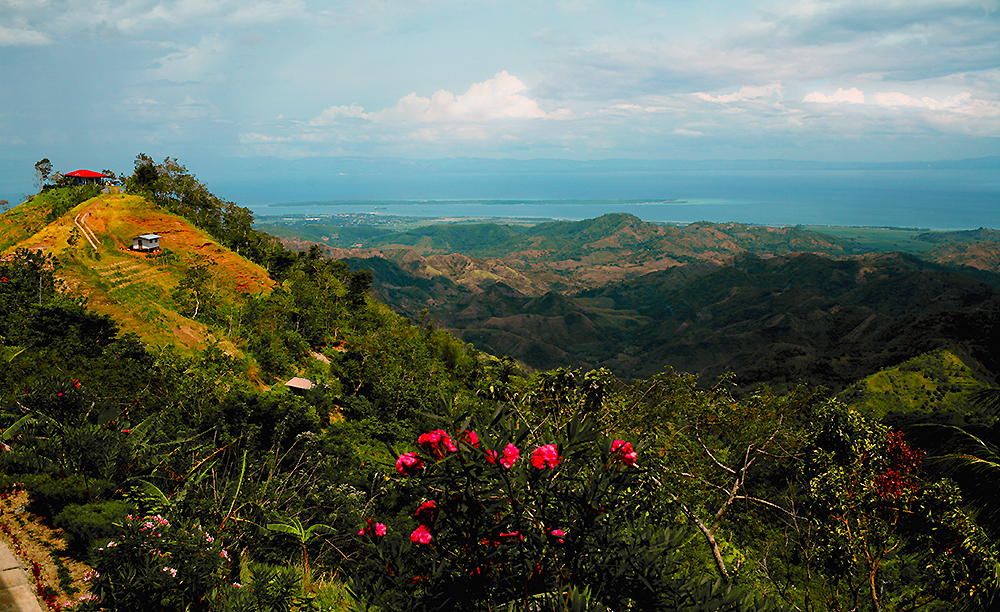
San Carlos highlands landscape

Located along the northeastern coast touching the Tañon Strait, San Carlos City is located along the boundary of two provinces, Negros Occidental and Negros Oriental. The city is also used as a departure point to Cebu City. It has a 40 km (25 mi) coastline, of which some parts are covered with mangroves. The city has a deep natural harbor protected from inclement weather by the island of Refugio, also known as Sipaway. Due to these aspects, the Philippine Ports Authority has chosen the San Carlos City port from among other ports in the province for its expansion program in 1998 which include the reclamation of four hectares of sea to accommodate various port buildings, facilities and container vans, an extension on the east side for two roll-on/roll-off (RO-RO) vessels and the extension of the length of the port to 242.50 m (795.6 ft). It is 87 kilometres (54 mi) east of Bacolod, via the Negros Occidental Eco-Tourism Highway (N69), and 168 kilometres (104 mi) from Dumaguete, the capital of Negros Oriental.

=== Climate ===
Climate data for San Carlos
Month	Jan	Feb	Mar	Apr	May	Jun	Jul	Aug	Sep	Oct	Nov	Dec	Year
Mean daily maximum °C (°F)	28 (82)	29 (84)	30 (86)	32 (90)	31 (88)	30 (86)	29 (84)	29 (84)	29 (84)	29 (84)	29 (84)	29 (84)	30 (85)
Mean daily minimum °C (°F)	23 (73)	23 (73)	23 (73)	24 (75)	25 (77)	25 (77)	25 (77)	25 (77)	25 (77)	24 (75)	24 (75)	23 (73)	24 (75)
Average precipitation mm (inches)	100 (3.9)	75 (3.0)	90 (3.5)	101 (4.0)	183 (7.2)	242 (9.5)	215 (8.5)	198 (7.8)	205 (8.1)	238 (9.4)	194 (7.6)	138 (5.4)	1,979 (77.9)
Average rainy days	14.9	11.3	14.5	17.4	26.4	28.4	28.5	27.5	26.9	28.4	24.2	17.2	265.6
Source: Meteoblue

San Carlos has two pronounced seasons, wet and dry. The rainy season is from May to January with heavy rains occurring during the months of August and September, and the dry season lasts from February to April. December and January are the coldest months while April is the hottest.

=== Barangays ===
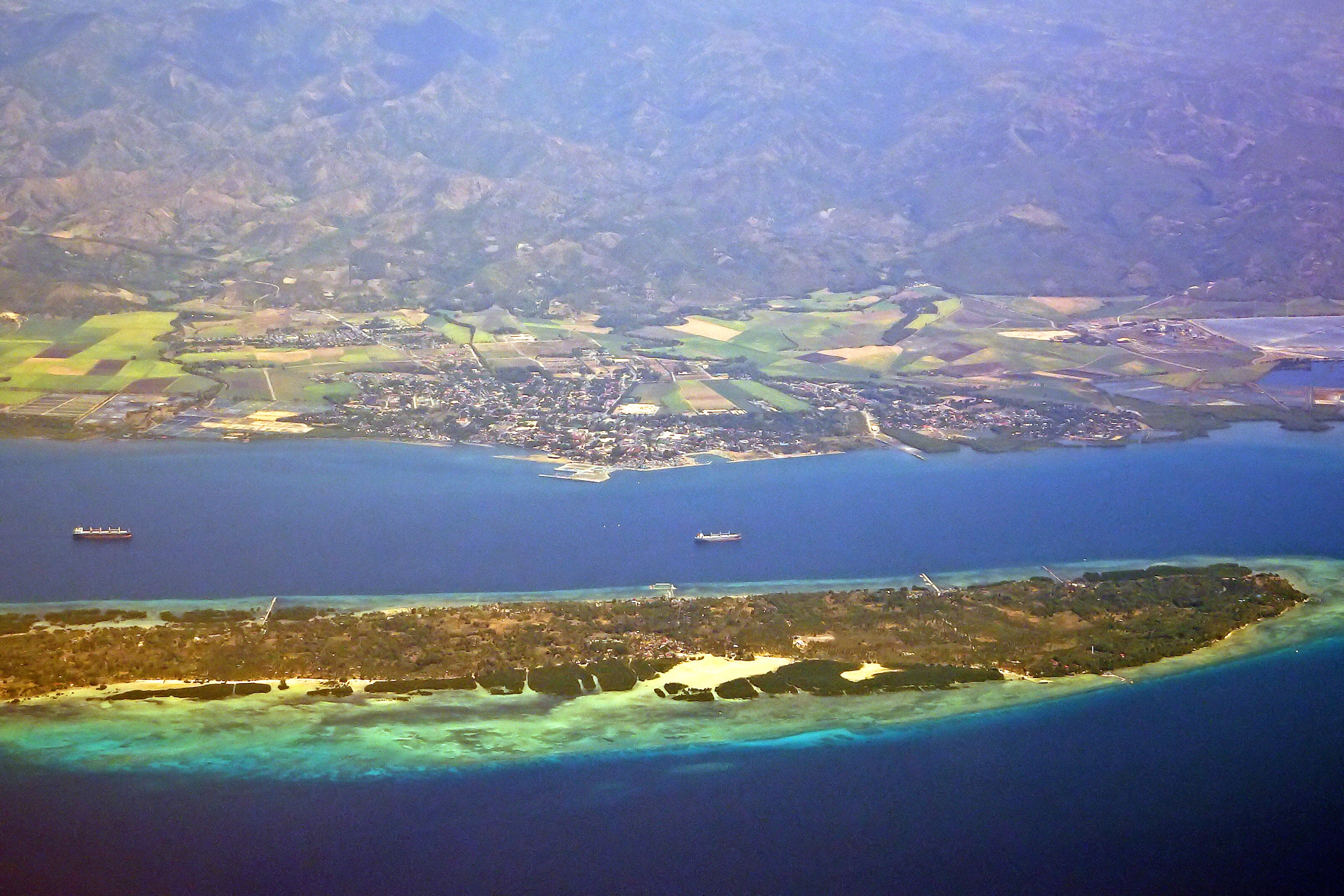
Aerial view of San Carlos, with Sipaway Island in foreground

San Carlos is politically subdivided into 18 barangays. Each barangay consists of puroks and some have sitios.

- Bagonbon
- Buluangan
- Codcod
- Ermita (Sipaway)
- Guadalupe
- Nataban
- Palampas
- Barangay I (Poblacion)
- Barangay II (Poblacion)
- Barangay III (Poblacion)
- Barangay IV (Poblacion)
- Barangay V (Poblacion)
- Barangay VI (Poblacion)
- Prosperidad
- Punao
- Quezon
- Rizal
- San Juan (Sipaway)

== Demographics ==
Population census of San Carlos
Year	Pop.	±% p.a.
1903	9,749	—
1918	42,453	+10.31%
1939	69,990	+2.41%
1948	92,250	+3.12%
1960	124,756	+2.55%
1970	90,058	−3.20%
1975	90,982	+0.20%
1980	91,627	+0.14%
1990	105,713	+1.44%
1995	101,429	−0.77%
2000	118,259	+3.35%
2007	129,809	+1.29%
2010	129,981	+0.05%
2015	132,536	+0.37%
2020	132,650	+0.02%
2024	133,175	+0.09%
Source: Philippine Statistics Authority

=== Languages ===
Cebuano is the predominant language of San Carlos, closely followed by Hiligaynon. Both languages are understood and used in both urban and rural areas. English and to some extent Tagalog are also spoken and understood, especially in urban areas.

== Economy ==
Poverty incidence of San Carlos (%)

Source: Philippine Statistics Authority

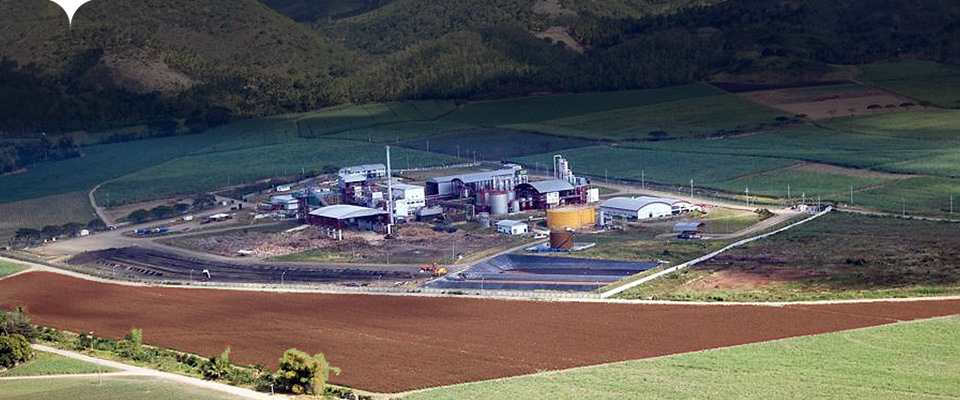
San Carlos BioPower

Located in the city is San Carlos Solar Energy, owner of the SaCaSol I solar installation located in the north of the city, currently the largest operational solar plant in the Philippines.

== Government ==
=== Elected officials ===
Members of the San Carlos City Council (2022–2025):

- Mayor: Renato Y. Gustilo
- Vice Mayor: Christopher Paul S. Carmona
- Councilors
  - Benito Y. Gustilo Jr.
  - Mark E. Cui
  - Armando L. Laguda Jr.
  - Victoriana C. Cabili
  - Carlos Manuel L. Valmayor
  - Wilmer L. Yap
  - Jose Carlos L. Villarante
  - Jonie S. Uy
  - Philip Gerard B. Maisog
  - Jeffrey M. Hidalgo
  - Liga ng mga Barangay President: PB Alfredo Martin A. Cui
  - SK Federation Representative: Mary Dawn P. Cañetan

=== List of former chief executives ===
From 1899 to the last days of the administration of the municipality of San Carlos, the following persons have served as presidentes and mayors:

==== 1899–1941 ====
- Agustin Ylagan (4 terms)
- Bernardino Lazanas
- Domingo Medina (2 terms)
- Eugenio Antonio, Jr.
- Fausto Caballero
- Jose Cervantes
- Juan P. Broce (2 terms)
- Pelagio Carbajosa
- Vicente Atienza
- Vicente Flores

==== 1942–1945 ====
- Antonio Azcona (in the occupied area)
- Anacleto Factoran (in the free area)
- Juan P. Broce

==== After 1945 ====
- Constancio Rabacal (2 terms)
- Constancio Rabacal (Appointed, 1946)
- Dominador Zaragoza (Appointed)
- Eugenio Antonio, Jr. (Appointed)
- Salvador T. Rigor, Jr.
- Gregorio R. Reonisto (OIC, 1987)
- Sofronio C. Carmona
- Jose V. Valmayor Jr.
- Tranquilino B. Carmona
- Rogelio "Roger" Debulgado (3 terms, 1992–2001)
- Eugenio Jose "Bong" Lacson
- Gerardo "Ginggo" Valmayor Jr.

== Tourism ==
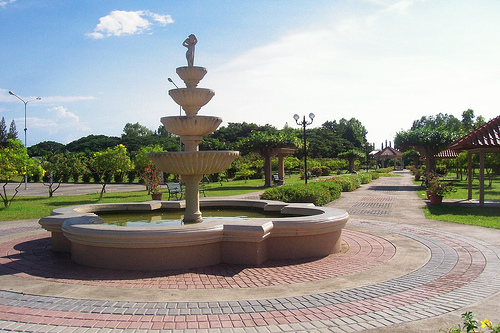
Paseo de Flores

The Pintaflores Festival was born out of the city's search for a cultural identity and tradition. In 1992 after successfully holding two activities with the Nabingkalan Tattoo Festival and the Dances of Flowers as highlights of the city fiesta, the idea of blending the two concepts to come up with a presentation that could be considered the city's very own started what today is one of the most popular street dancing festivals in the region, the Pintaflores Festival.

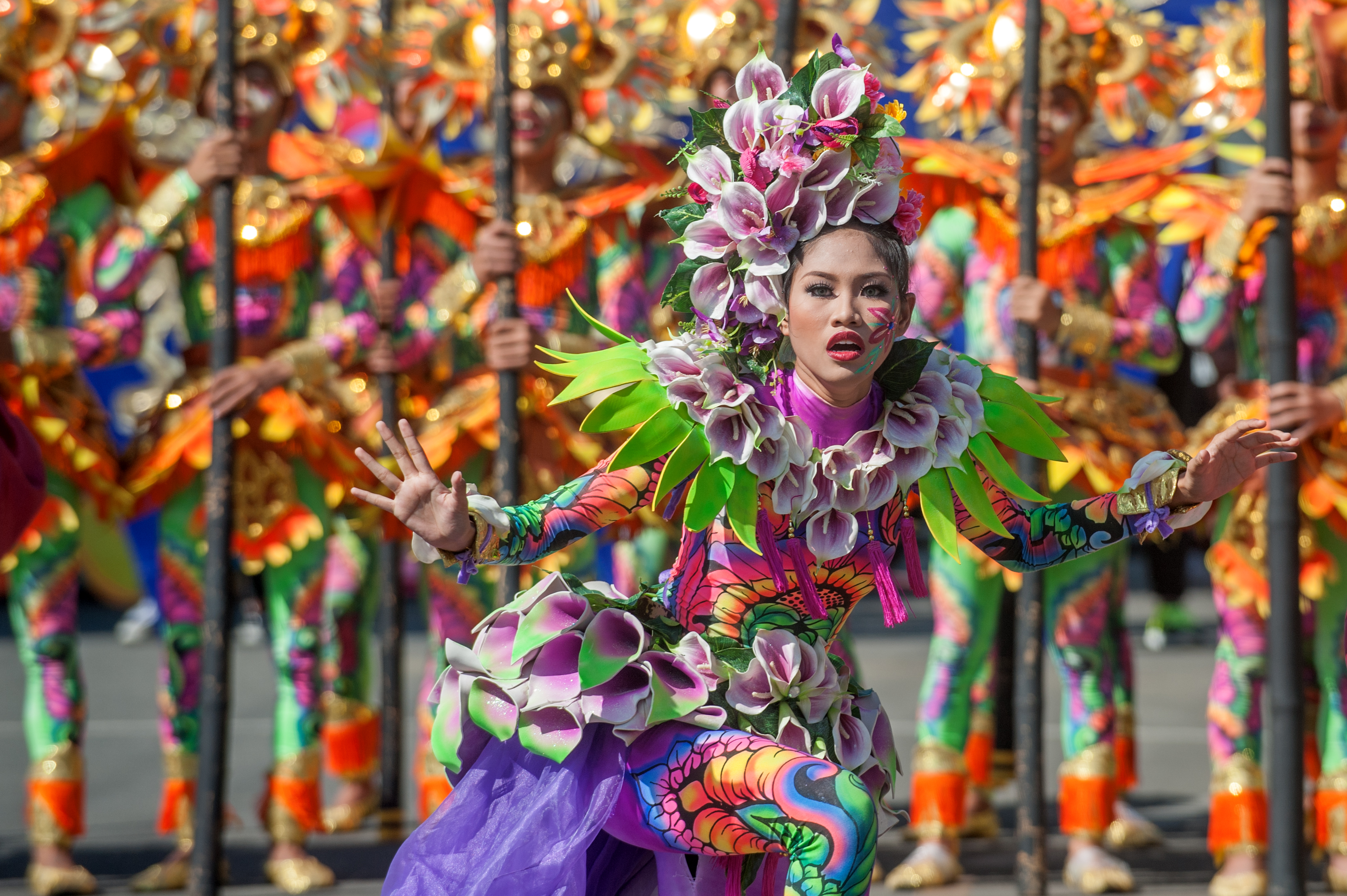
The Pintaflores Festival

Pintaflores was coined from the Spanish words pintados (lit. 'painted ones'), the concept behind the Nabingkalan Tattoo Festival, and flores (lit. 'flowers'), the theme of the Dances of Flowers. The pintaflores street dancing and ritual competition are the highlights of the annual festival every November 3–5.

It features rhythmic dances and dance dramas of life and death and the triumph of good against evil that depict the people's thanksgiving and merriment, abundant blessings and success. As part of the pintados tradition, the faces, arms, bodies and legs of the dancers are painted with flowers to express gratitude to man and his environment.

The street dancing culminates in a dance ritual performed at the city auditorium. Different dance steps and musical accompaniment add to the thrill of the competition. The human flower formation is another part of the ritual which is created by choreographed dancers.

Colegio de Santo Tomas – Recoletos high school students bested seasoned contestants to land third place in the free interpretation category in the heavily contested Sinulog festival in Cebu City in January 1993. In April of the same year, the group won the championship in Panaad Sa Negros, a province-wide cultural festival in Negros Occidental.

Represented by barangays II and Quezon, the Pintaflores street dancing contingent won first prize in Panaad Sa Negros in 1996. The same group with the participation of barangay Ermita secured the championship again in 1997 and the fifth prize in Sinulog festival 1998.

In the 1998 Panaad sa Negros, the Pintaflores group composed of dancers from barangays Punao and Palampas and the City Hospital appeared in the fiesta presentation as guest performers. In the 1999 festival the group, represented by elementary school children, continued its unbeatable streak by emerging champions, consequently reaping the Hall of Fame award for topping the fiesta presentation event in four consecutive years.

Having established a name in street dancing, Pintaflores danced performers in such places as Iloilo City in 1996 and Roxas City in 1997 among the best of the best in the region, and in Canlaon and Victorias in 1999 as the best in the province.

Pintaflores has evolved as a new breed of dancers emerged with the 1996 launch of Pintaflores Bata or Pinta Bata, a street dancing and ritual competition among elementary school children.

After five years and many awards, including the Panaad sa Negros Hall of Fame awards, the word Pintaflores, like Daan Sa Kaunlaran and the Homelot program, has become another byword of the creativity of San Carloseños.

== Transportation ==
Buses and jeepneys are common modes of transport to get to and from San Carlos. Motorized tricycles and pedicabs provide service for intra-town travel. Local outriggers and pump boats provide inter-island travel to and from Sipaway Island.

The city is regularly served by RO-RO ferry services to Toledo City, Cebu.

The city is one of the termini of the Negros Occidental Eco-Tourism Highway, numbered N69 in the Philippine highway system. At the other end is the city of Bacolod, about 2 hours away.

== Education ==
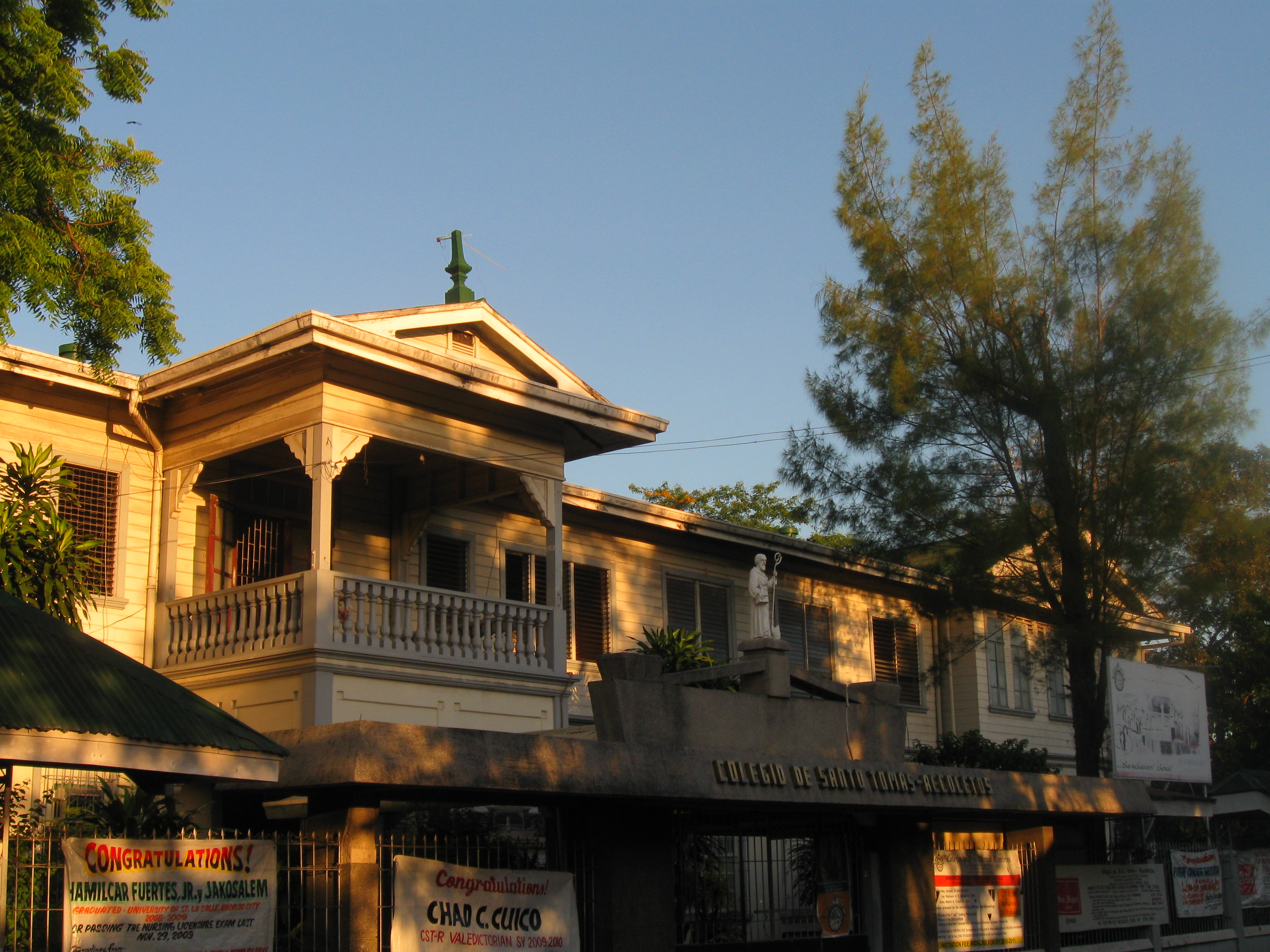
Colegio de Santo Tomas – Recoletos

- Julio Ledesma National High School
- Bagonbon National High School
- Sipaway National High School
- Our Lady of Peace Mission School Inc
- Colegio de Santa Rita de San Carlos, Inc.
- Colegio de Santo Tomas – Recoletos
- Central Negros College
- Tañon College
- Daisy's ABC School Foundation Inc.
- Central Philippines State University – Justo V. Valmayor Campus
- Sipaway National High School
- Don Carlos Ledesma National High School
- Ramon Magsaysay Elementary School

== Notable personalities ==
Another historical milestone in the life of the city is the cabinet meeting of President Fidel V. Ramos in the city on August 27, 1996, making San Carlos the first component city to be made the venue of a Presidential Cabinet meeting. Award-winning actress Assunta de Rossi became a resident in the city when she married then congressman Jules Ledesma. Former boxer Gerry Peñalosa also hails from the city. Romeo Villalva Tabuena, an artist included in Who's Who in American Art, and has had works featured in publications like the "American Artists", "Diplomat", "Literary Review" and the "Reporter", has family roots in San Carlos. Elizabeth Ramsey, a comedian and the mother of singer Jaya also hail from the city. Reiven Bulado, an actor who played Ibo in the MMFF film Panaghoy sa Suba was born in San Carlos and attended high school at the Colegio de Santo Tomas – Recoletos.

List

- Jose Advincula - Cardinal (Catholic) ,2nd Bishop of the Diocese of San Carlos (Negros Occidental), 3rd Metropolitan Archbishop of the Archdiocese of Capiz, 33rd Metropolitan Archbishop of the Archdiocese of Manila
- Gerardo Alminaza - Catholic Prelate, 3rd Bishop of the Diocese of San Carlos (Negros Occidental)
- Assunta De Rossi - Film and television actress, wife of Negros Occidental’s 1st congressional district representative Jules Ledesma
- Jaya (singer) - singer, actress, and television personality
- Bong Lacson - Mayor of San Carlos, 42nd Governor of Negros Occidental
- Jules Ledesma - Negros Occidental 1st Congressional District representative, one of the wealthiest politicians in the Philippines with a net worth of ₱1.8 billion or $98 million USD
- Salvador Trane Modesto - Catholic prelate, Auxiliary Bishop of the Diocese of San Carlos (Negros Occidental)
- Nicolas M. Mondejar - Catholic prelate, 1st Bishop of the Diocese of Romblon , 1st Bishop of the Diocese of San Carlos (Negros Occidental)
- Dodie Boy Peñalosa - International Boxing Federation junior-flyweight champion, International Boxing Federation flyweight champion
- Gerry Peñalosa - World Boxing Council super-flyweight champion, World Boxing Organization bantamweight champion
- Elizabeth Ramsey - singer, comedian and actress
- Joel Villarino - member of the Philippines national football team, football coach
