= IslaSol II =

Photovoltaic power station

islaSol II
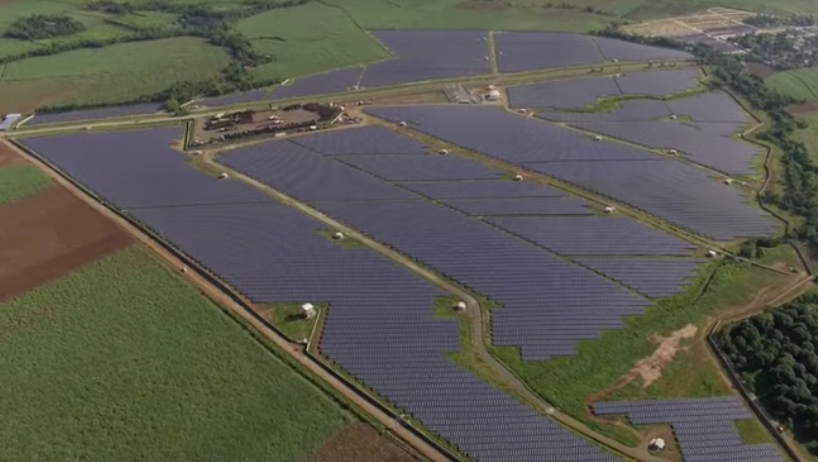
- Country: Philippines
- Location: Manapla, Negros Occidental
- Coordinates: 10°56′53″N 123°09′56″E
- Status: In full commercial operation
- Construction began: 2015
- Commission date: February/March 2016
- Owner: San Carlos Solar Energy

Solar farm
- Type: Flat-panel PV
- Site area: 64 ha (158 acres)

Power generation
- Nameplate capacity: 48 MW

External links
- Website: www.sacasol.com

islaSol II formerly known as SaCaSol III is a 48-megawatt (MW) photovoltaic power station under construction developed by Bronzeoak Philippines for San Carlos Solar Energy Inc. (SaCaSol), located in Negros Occidental, Philippines.

islaSol II, follows SaCaSol I, the country's largest solar farm currently being expanded from 22 MW to 45 MW, and islaSol I, also being under construction with a planned final capacity of 32 megawatts.
