= IslaSol I =

Philippine photovoltaic power station

islaSol I
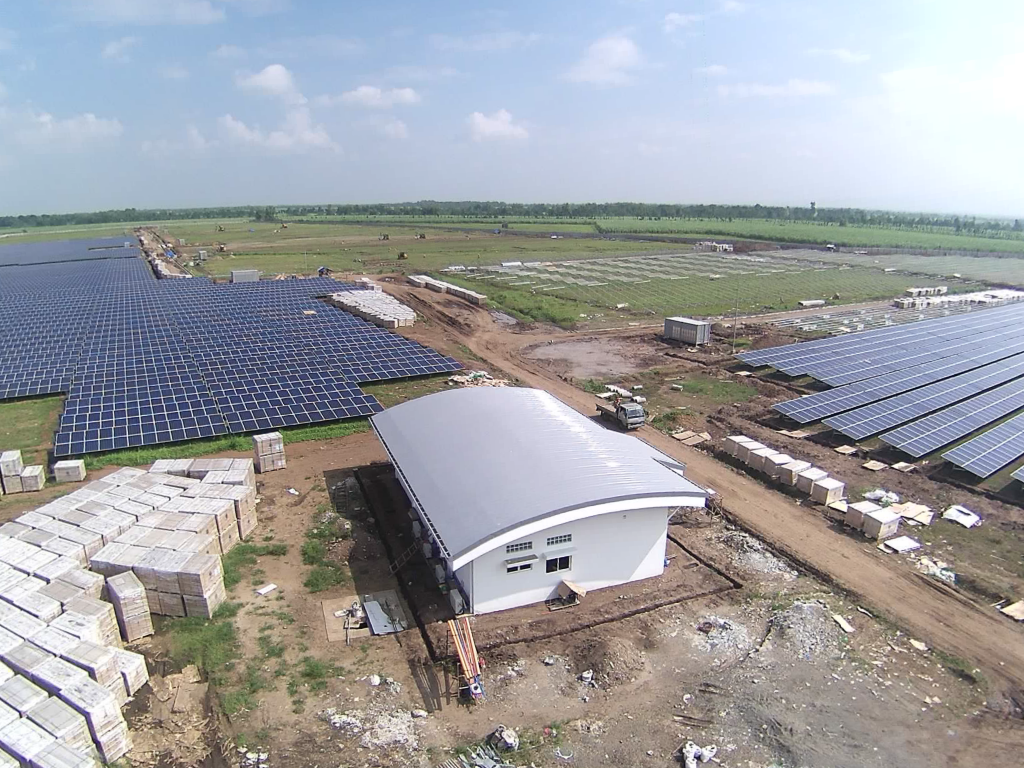
- Country: Philippines
- Location: La Carlota, Negros Occidental
- Coordinates: 10°25′22″N 122°56′12″E
- Status: operational
- Construction began: May 16, 2014
- Commission date: December 2015
- Owner: San Carlos Solar Energy

Solar farm
- Type: Flat-panel PV
- Site area: 35 ha (86 acres)

Power generation
- Nameplate capacity: 18 MW

External links
- Website: www.sacasol.com

islaSol I, formerly known as SaCaSol II is a 18-megawatt (MW) photovoltaic power station developed by Bronzeoak Philippines for San Carlos Solar Energy Inc. (SaCaSol), in La Carlota, Negros Occidental. It covers 247,300 m^{2} and supplies about 41,000 people with energy. The solar park is operated by Negros Island Solar Power Inc. The estimated reduction of CO_{2} is more than 14,000 metric tons per year.

islaSol I, follows SaCaSol I, the country's largest solar farm currently being expanded from 22 MW to 45 MW. There is also a third project under construction, islaSol II, with a capacity of 48 megawatts.
