= Cagayancillo Airport =

Airport in Palawan, Philippines

Cagayancillo Airport Paliparan ng Cagayancillo (Filipino)
- IATA: none; ICAO: none

Summary
- Airport type: Public
- Owner/Operator: Province of Palawan
- Serves: Cagayancillo
- Location: Brgy. Magsaysay, Cagayancillo, Palawan
- Coordinates: 09°34′10″N 121°11′11″E
- Interactive map of Cagayancillo Airport

Cagayancillo Airport, also known as Magsaysay Airport, is an airport serving the general area of Cagayancillo, located in the province of Palawan in the Philippines. It is located in the barangay of Magsaysay, at the southern portion of Cagayancillo.

== Development ==
The Province of Palawan initiated P5 million worth of repairs on Cagayancillo to boost tourism development and disaster preparedness. Currently, the airport is serviced by scheduled charter flights using a 6-seater Cessna plane from Sipalay Airport. The flights are chartered for Easy Diving Resort, based in Sipalay, which also operates professional diving services off the waters of Cagayancillo.

== Incidents and accidents ==
On July 2, 2000, a GAF Nomad propeller plane with registration no. N286, operated by the Philippine Air Force, crashed off the waters of Cagayancillo. It carried Palawan Governor Salvador Socrates and Maj. Gen. Santiago Madrid, along with 11 other passengers and crew. Only one passenger survived and was rescued by the Coast Guard.

== See also ==
- List of airports in the Philippines
