= Colegio de Santo Tomas – Recoletos =

Roman Catholic college in Negros Occidental, Philippines

Colegio de Sto. Tomas – Recoletos
- Unity in diversity
- Former name: Sto. Tomas de Villanueva Institute (1941-1953)
- Motto: Caritas et Scientia (Latin)
- Motto in English: Charity and Knowledge
- Type: Private, Roman Catholic Coeducational Secondary & Tertiary education institution
- Established: June 20, 1941
- Religious affiliation: Roman Catholic (Augustinian Recollects)
- Academic affiliations: PAASCU
- President: Rev. Fr. Cristopher C. Maspara, OAR
- Vice-president: List: Rev. Fr. Joel G. Dequilla, OAR (VP for Administration & Finance); Rev. Fr. Cristopher C. Maspara, OAR (VP for Academics and Research); Rev. Fr. Monday Benjamine Edobor, OAR (VP for Identity, Mission, Formation)
- Principal: Marinell T. Ocampo, LPT
- Prefect of Discipline for Boys: Isaias O. Dela Paz
- Students: ~1,000 (2022)
- Location: Azcona Street, San Carlos City, Negros Occidental, Philippines; 10°28′56″N 123°24′59″E
- Campus: Urban, 13,565 m^{2} (146,010 sq ft)
- Colors: Gold and white
- Nickname: Golden eagles
- Mascot: Golden Eagle
- Website: www.cstr.edu.ph
- Location in the Visayas Location in the Philippines

The Colegio de Santo Tomas – Recoletos (colloquially known as Santo Tomas, or CST-R) is the first formal Recollect school in the Philippines. It is located in San Carlos, Negros Occidental, and used to be known as the Sto. Tomas de Villanueva Institute. Colegio de Sto. Tomas - Recoletos. A private college, it also provides Secondary education for young men and women. As of August 2022, the institution now provides tertiary education, offering courses in Criminology and Entrepreneurship.

== History ==
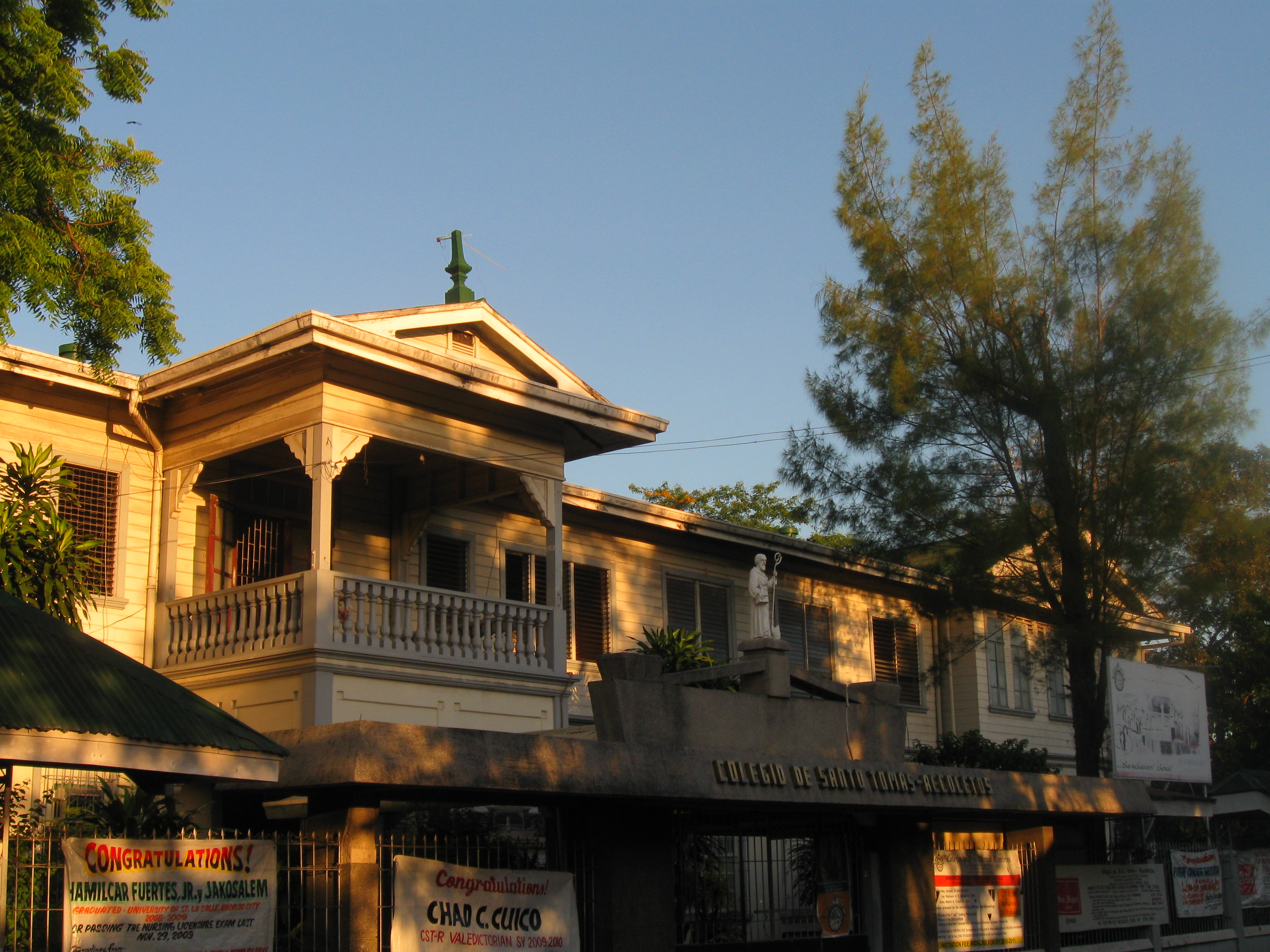
The Colegio de Santo Tomas – Recoletos facade

On April 19, 1940, during the Provincial Chapter in the old Convent in Intramuros (Manila), the idea of establishing a Center of Learning of the Augustinian Recollect was put forward. The school was to be founded in San Carlos. On September 28, 1940, the Father Provincial sent a circular letter to Recollect Fathers working in the Diocese of Bacolod (covering the whole Negros Island), asking them to help in the construction of the school building.

Fr. Tirso Ruana, OAR was tasked to spearhead the construction of the school building. He requested Mr. Eusebio Calderon, the parish organist, to look for a lot where the building would be erected. On October 12, 1940, with the execution of an Absolute Deed of Sale, the Augustinian Recollect Fathers acquired a 13,565 square meter lot for Php 4,400 from Don Emilio Broce along Azcona St.

Fr. Provincial of the Province of San Nicolas de Tolentino and Fr. Pedro Garcia, OAR, laid the cornerstone on December 19, 1940. The school was intended as a school for boys only offering secondary education with its counterpart, Colegio de Sta. Rita, a school for girls, run by the Augustinian Recollect Sisters.

After a year of construction, on June 20, 1941, the Solemn Blessing was officiated by the Most Rev. Casimiro Lladoc, D.D., Bishop of Bacolod, and was attended by civil and ecclesiastical dignitaries. Three days after, the school was opened with the enrolment of 153 boys. Fr. Pedro Zunzarren, OAR was appointed as the first Rector.

When World War II broke out on December 8, 1941, the school was closed two days after. The school was converted into a hospital and later on, was used by the United States Armed Forces in the Far East as a training camp for Filipino recruits who were later sent to the battlefront. With the arrival of the Japanese Imperial Army in San Carlos City, it took over the school, and made it their headquarters and jail.

In 1945 the school resumed classes with the enrolment of 137 boys. Fr. Gregorio Espiga assumed the Directorship of the school.

On March 4, 1947, the Department of Instruction under the Commonwealth Government of the Philippines granted Government Recognition No. 24, Series of 1947 to Sto. Tomas de Villanueva Institute offering a complete general secondary course (day) with the authority to issue its graduates the secondary school diplomas.

During 1950 to 1952 Santo Tomas de Villanueva Institute began to accept Grade V and Grade VI pupils because there were not enough classrooms in the public elementary school. Only 27 graduated from the grade school. It was closed after operating for two school years.

In June 1971, under the directorship of Fr. Anesio Villanueva, CST-R broke its tradition as a High School for Boys when it accepted of girls. Manuelita Caballero and Perla Detomal were the first two female Thomasian graduates.

In August 1993, the college gained an Accredited Status from the Department of Education, Culture and Sports (DECS) based on the National College Entrance Examination (NCEE) performance as one of the top 250 schools in the country.

By virtue of the Enhanced Basic Education Act of 2013 or the Republic Act 10533, CST-R opened the Senior High School Department in June 2016 and offered the Academic Track covering Science, Technology, Engineering & Mathematics (STEM), Accountancy & Business Management (ABM), and the General Academic Strand (GAS). The pilot SHS Batch was divided into five sections and had 220 students. During the next school year, GAS was phased out and the school's Academic Track was enhanced by offering the Humanities and Social Sciences Strand (HUMSS).

March 25, 2018, 208 Thomasians became the historic batch of CST-R's first Senior High School Department graduates. On their graduation day, they were the first to wear the iconic gold and red toga especially designed for Colegio de Sto. Tomas-Recoletos graduates.

During the onset of the pandemic that closed down Philippine schools, CST-R stayed true to its 80th Foundation Anniversary Theme: "Timeless. Treasured. Transformative." when it migrated to the Thomasian Learning Management System (TLMS) to offer distance learning education. CST-R transformed delivery modes into Online Learning and Modular Classes to continue education even when students are barred from campuses due to COVID-19.

In the coming School Year 2021-2022 under the leadership of Rev. Fr. Joel Alve, OAR, school director & principal, CST-R aims to finally open its College Department and to transition into the new TLMS with Blended Learning Set-Up as an added class option.

On February 8, 2022, authorized through Government Permit No. 3, series of 2022 from the Commission on Higher Education Region VI Office, CST-R opened up the College of Business, offering the Bachelor of Science in Entrepreneurship. Later that year on May 17, 2022, through Government Permit No. 14, series of 2022 from CHED R6O, the College of Criminal Justice Education was opened, offering the Bachelor of Science in Criminology.

On August 22, 2022, Academic Year 2022-2023 began in CST-R with the return to face-to-face classes for all year levels.

=== List of School Directors (1941-2022) ===
- Rev. Fr. Pedro Zunzarren, OAR (1941-1945)
- Rev. Fr. Gregorio Espiga, OAR (1946-1952)
- Rev. Fr. Bernardino Fabregat, OAR (1952-1955)
- Rev. Fr. Federico Terradillos, OAR (1955-1958)
- Rev. Fr. Martin Legarra, OAR (1958-1961)
- Rev. Fr. Antonio Ausejo, OAR (1961-1964)
- Rev. Fr. Jesus Solabre, OAR (1964-1967)
- Rev. Fr. Jesus Martinez, OAR (1967-1968)
- Rev. Fr. Melquiades Modequillo, OAR (1968-1970)
- Rev. Fr. Anesio Villanueva, OAR (1970-1973)
- Rev. Fr. Jose Ma. Juango, OAR (1973-1976)
- Rev. Fr. Huberto Decena, OAR (1976)
- Rev. Fr. Delfin Castillo, OAR (1976-1977)
- Rev. Fr. Rafael Cabarles, OAR (1977-1979)
- Rev. Fr. Jose Ma. Juango, OAR (1979-1982)
- Rev. Fr. Antonio Palacios, OAR (1982-1985)
- Rev. Fr. Jose Ma. Juango, OAR (1985-1988)
- Rev. Fr. Rafael Cabarles, OAR (1988-1994)
- Rev. Fr. Lino Agunod, OAR (1994-1997)
- Rev. Fr. Constantino Real, OAR (1997-2000)
- Rev. Fr. Enrico Silab, OAR (2000-2003)
- Rev. Fr. Pedro A. Escanillas, OAR (2003-2009)
- Rev. Fr. Vicente L. Ramon, Jr., OAR (2009-2012)
- Rev. Fr. Paulino H. Dacanay, OAR (2012-2015)
- Rev. Fr. Joel A. Alve, OAR (2015-2022)

=== List of Basic Education Directors (2022-present) ===
- Rev. Fr. Cristopher C. Maspara, OAR (2022-present)

=== List of School Presidents (2022-present) ===
- Rev. Fr. Cristopher C. Maspara, OAR (2022-present)

== School organizations and clubs ==
=== Sports clubs ===
- Golden Eagles Football Club
- Golden Eagles Beach Volleyball Club

=== Service groups ===
- CST-R Supreme Student Council (SSC)
- Recollect Augustinian Youth (RAY)
- Tomasian Emergency Assistance Management (TEAM)
- Designers and Arts Club (DAC)
- Thomasian Chorale (Choir)
- Hosting Club
- CST-R Boy Scouts of the Philippines Corps
  - Rover Scout Circle 241
  - Senior Scout Unit 242
- CST-R Girl Scouts of the Philippines Unit
- CST-R Citizenship Advancement Training Corps of Cadets (CAT)
- CST-R Air Force Reserve Officers' Training Corps (AFROTC)

== Order of Augustinian Recollects (OAR) sister schools ==
=== Sister schools ===
- University of Negros Occidental – Recoletos (Bacolod)
- University of San Jose – Recoletos (Cebu City)
- San Sebastian College–Recoletos (Manila)
  - San Sebastian College–Recoletos de Manila, Canlubang satellite campus (Calamba, Laguna)
- San Sebastian College – Recoletos de Cavite
- Colegio de San Pedro–Recoletos (Poblacion, Valencia, Negros Oriental)
- San Pedro Academy – Recoletos (Caidiocan, Valencia, Negros Oriental)
- Colegio San Nicolas de Tolentino – Recoletos (formerly UNO-R High School Talisay Branch) (Talisay City, Negros Occidental)

=== Seminary and formation houses ===
- Santo Tomas de Villanueva Recoletos Formation House (High School) (San Carlos City, Negros Occidental)
- Casiciaco Recoleos Seminary (formerly Seminario Mayor – Recoletos de Baguio) (Philosophy) (Baguio)
- Recoletos Formation Center (Theology) (Mira-Nila Homes, Quezon City)
