= Diocese of San Carlos (Negros Occidental) =

Latin Catholic diocese in the Philippines

Diocese of San Carlos Dioecesis Sancti Caroli Borromeo Diyosesis sang San Carlos Diyosesis sa San Carlos Diyosesis ng San Carlos

Catholic
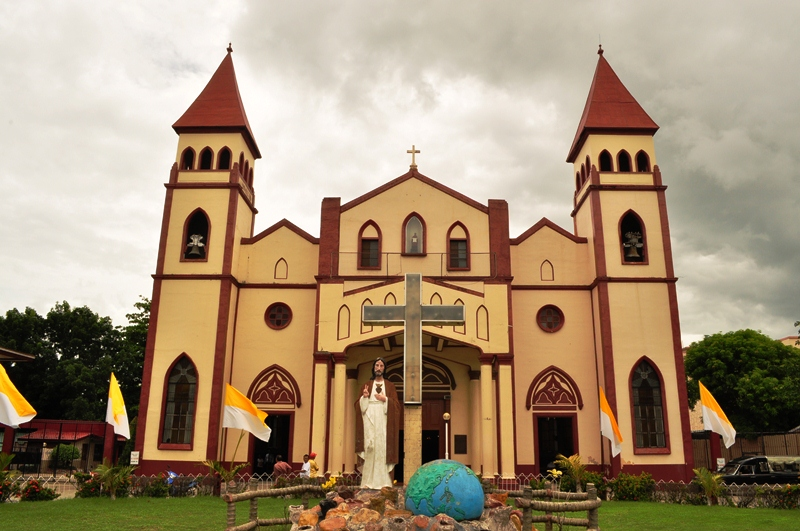
- San Carlos Cathedral

- Coat of arms

Location
- Country: Philippines
- Territory: 1st and 2nd congressional districts of Negros Occidental (Calatrava, Cadiz, Don Salvador Benedicto, Escalante, Manapla, Sagay, San Carlos, Toboso); Negros Oriental (Canlaon, Guihulngan, Vallehermoso, La Libertad)
- Ecclesiastical province: Jaro
- Coordinates: 10°28′53″N 123°25′07″E

Statistics
- Area: 3,041 km^{2} (1,174 sq mi)
- Population: Total; Catholics: (as of 2021); 1,146,519; 980,732 (85.5%)
- Parishes: 34

Information
- Denomination: Catholic Church
- Sui iuris church: Latin Church
- Rite: Roman Rite
- Established: March 30, 1987
- Cathedral: Cathedral of St Charles Borromeo in San Carlos, Negros Occidental
- Patron saint: Charles Borromeo
- Secular priests: 71

Current leadership
- Pope: Leo XIV
- Bishop: Gerardo Alimane Alminaza
- Metropolitan Archbishop: Midyphil B. Billones

The Diocese of San Carlos (Latin: Dioecesis Sancti Caroli Borromeo) is a Latin Church ecclesiastical jurisdiction or diocese of the Catholic Church in the Philippines. The diocese was split off from the Diocese of Bacolod together with the Diocese of Kabankalan in 1987, and is a suffragan in the ecclesiastical province of the metropolitan Archdiocese of Jaro in Iloilo City. The seat of the cathedral is the San Carlos Borromeo Cathedral in San Carlos City, Negros Occidental.

== Ordinaries ==
Bishop		Period in office	Coat of arms
1.	Nicolas Mollenedo Mondejar	21 Nov 1987 – 25 Jul 2001 (13 years, 246 days)	
2.	Jose Fuerte Advincula	25 Jul 2001 – 9 Nov 2011 (10 years, 107 days)	
Sede vacante	Patrick Daniel Yee Parcon; Diocesan Administrator	9 Nov 2011 – 14 Sep 2013	
3.	Gerardo Alimane Alminaza	14 Sep 2013 – present (12 years, 319 days)	

=== Auxiliary bishops ===
Bishop		Period in office	Coat of arms
1.	Salvador Trane Modesto	30 Mar 1987 – 25 Jul 2005 (18 years, 117 days)	

== See also ==
- Catholic Church in the Philippines
