= San Carlos Solar Energy =

- Industry: Renewable energy
- Headquarters: San Carlos, Negros Occidental, Philippines
- Services: Renewable energy
- Website: www.sacasol.com

San Carlos Solar Energy Inc. (abbreviated as SaCaSol) is a Philippine energy company based in San Carlos, Negros Occidental that generates renewable energy particularly solar energy.

== Solar power stations ==
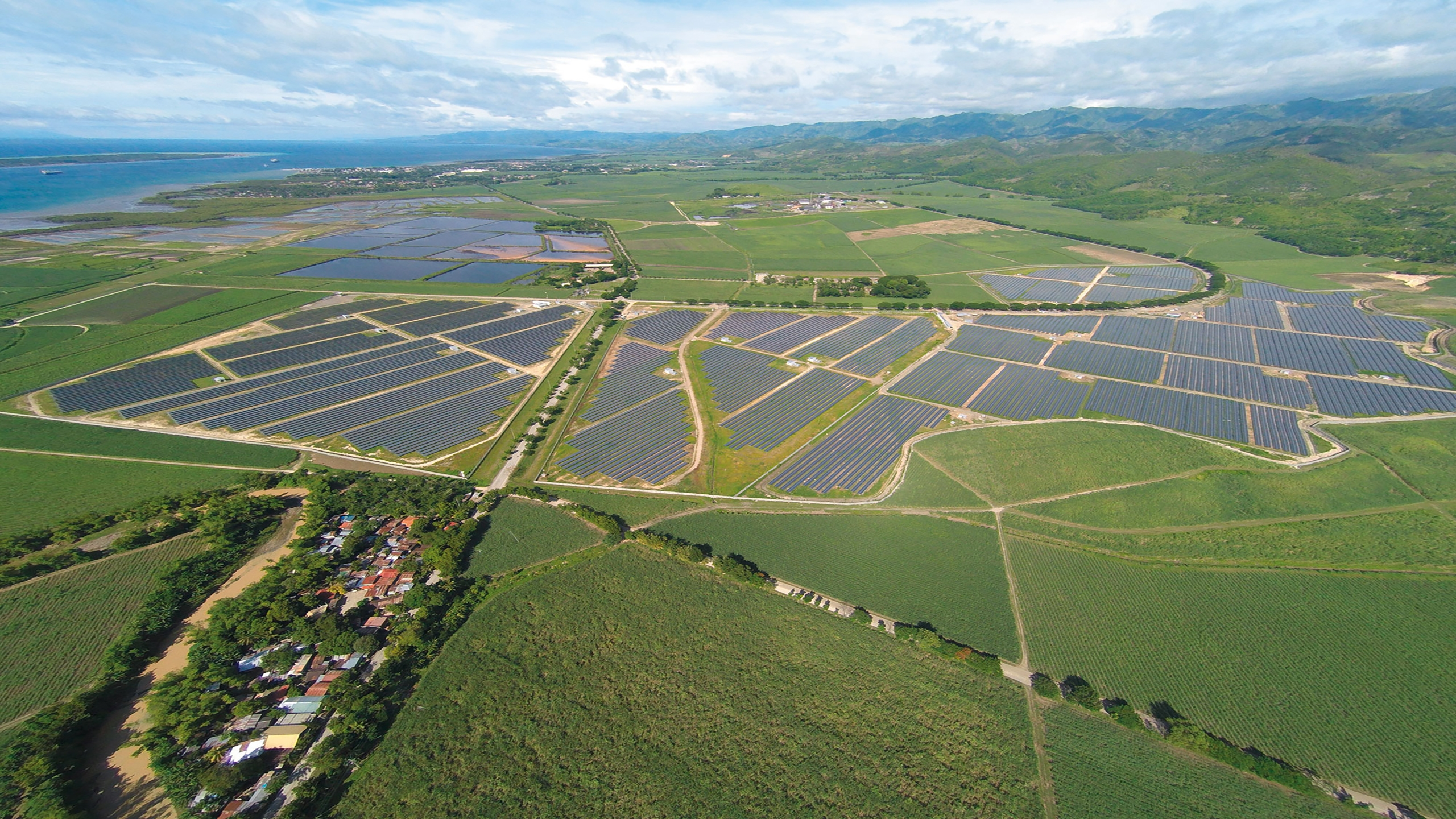
SaCaSol I

San Carlos Solar Energy operates solar power stations in the island of Negros. The SaCaSol I is the largest solar power facility in Southeast Asia by the time of its commissioning.

Power plant	Location	Nameplate capacity	Status
SaCaSol I	San Carlos, Negros Occidental	45 MW	Operational
islaSol I	La Carlota, Negros Occidental	32 MW	Under construction
islaSol II	Manapla, Negros Occidental	48 MW	Under construction

== Reception ==
When choosing the Solar Power Project of the Year, the Charlton Media Group gave the company's SaCaSol I the Silver Asian Power Award 2014. During the same event, San Carlos Solar Energy, Inc. won bronze as part of the Independent Power Producer of the Year Award.

The International Finance Corporation (IFC), a World Bank subsidiary, bestowed the Sustainable Energy Finance Award 2014 on San Carlos Solar Energy Inc. The Philippine solar investment company belonging to the ThomasLloyd Cleantech Infrastructure Fund, put the first utility-scale solar power plant into operation in spring 2014.

Frost & Sullivan, a global management consultancy, gave the Best Practices Award 2014 in the category of Philippines Solar Photovoltaic System Integrator of the Year, to San Carlos Solar Energy, Inc., the solar portfolio company of ThomasLloyd Cleantech Infrastructure Fund.

The Asia CEO Forum nominated San Carlos Solar Energy Inc. as Green Company of the Year. The Forum is considered one of the most important forums in the Asia-Pacific region committed to collaboration between regional and international organisations and companies.
