= San Carlos BioPower =

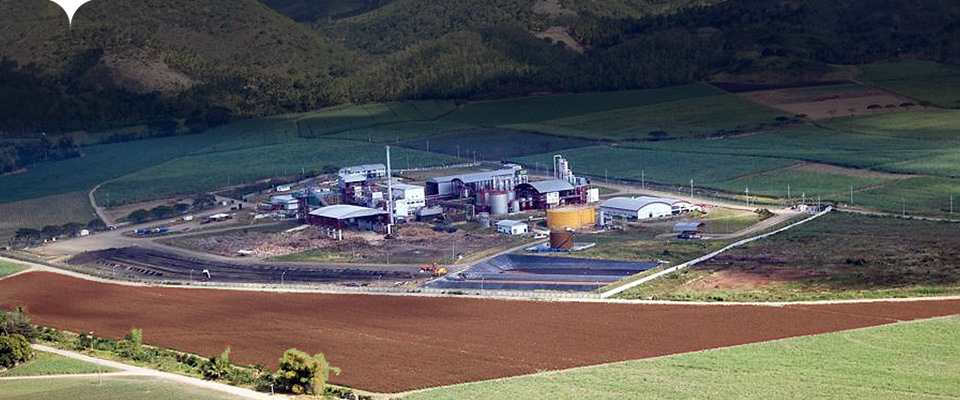
- View from above on the project site with about 210,000 m²
- Country: Philippines
- Location: San Carlos, Negros Occidental
- Coordinates: 10°30′36″N 123°25′16″E
- Status: operational
- Construction began: April 2013
- Commission date: December 2016

Thermal power station
- Primary fuel: Cane trash with some grassy and woody energy crop plants

Power generation
- Nameplate capacity: 20 MW planned

External links
- Website: www.scbiopower.com

San Carlos BioPower is a biomass-fired power station under construction in San Carlos, Negros Occidental in the Philippines. It is among the biggest biomass power stations in the Philippines and has a generating capacity of 20 megawatts, enough electricity to provide 212,000 people in the region’s urban centres and rural areas on the island of Negros. The estimated reduction of CO_{2} is more than 16,000 metric tons per year. The power plant is a cooperation between ThomasLloyd CTI Asia Holdings Pte and Bronzeoak Philippines. General Contractor is Wuxi Huaguang Electric Power Engineering.

The plant will be primary feed with cane trash with some grassy and woody energy crop plants. The feedstock utilisation will bei 170,000 tonnes per year with a local feedstock availability of 1.1 to 1.7 million tonnes per year within a 40 km-radius catchment area. It will operate with a fuel mix of 100,000 tonnes sugarcane trash, 43,000 tonnes grassy biomass, 18,000 tonnes woody biomass and 8,000 tonnes of other biomass. The plant will be connected to an existing 69 kV substation, 1.5 km away when operational. The power plant is expected to create 600 new jobs in the plant and 2,000 jobs in feedstock production and collection.
