= Sipalay Airport =

Airport in Sipalay, Negros Occidental

Sipalay Airport Hulugpaan sang Sipalay (Hiligaynon) Paliparan ng Sipalay (Filipino)
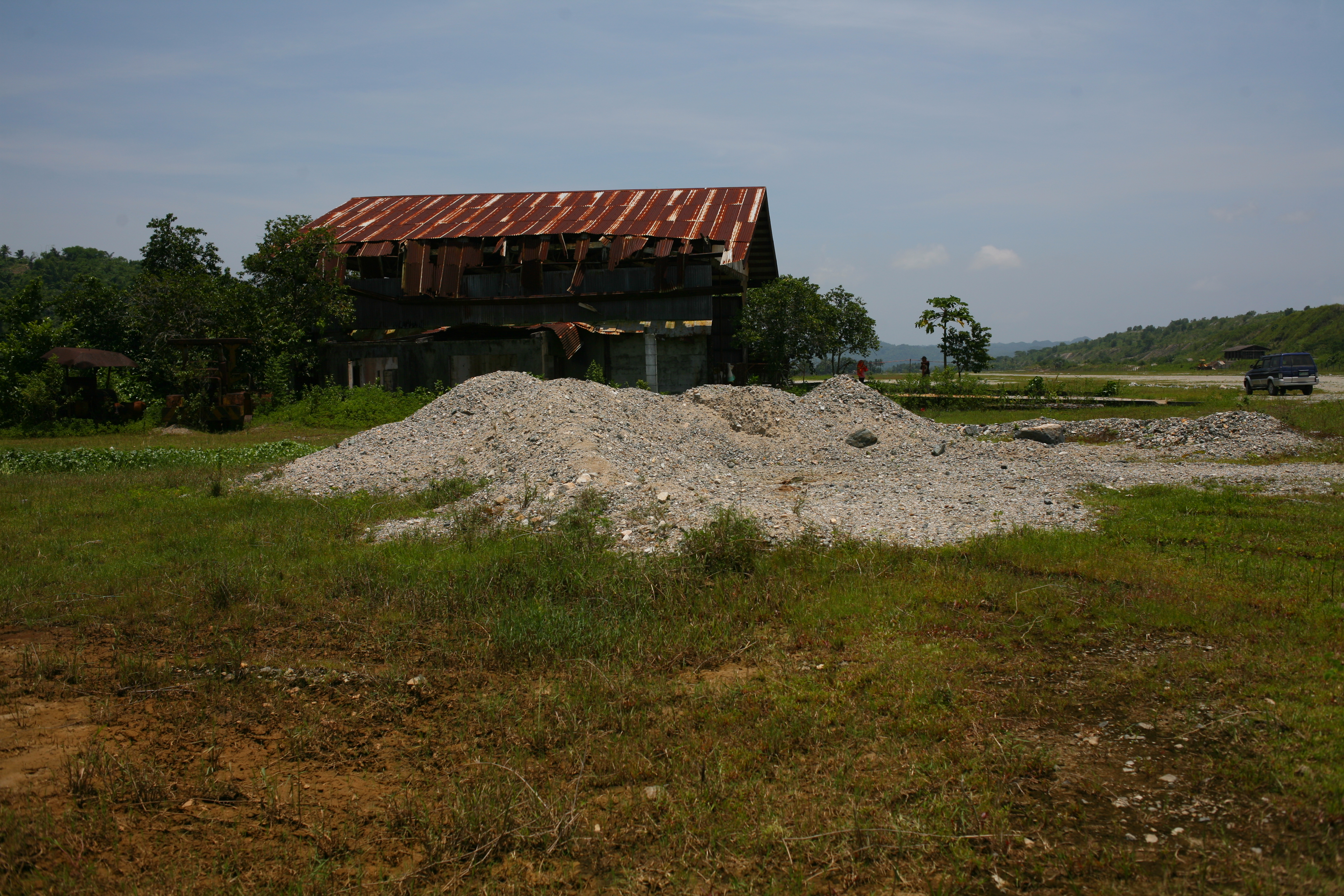
- IATA: none; ICAO: none

Summary
- Owner/Operator: City Government of Sipalay
- Serves: Sipalay, Negros Occidental, Philippines
- Location: Barangay San Jose
- Coordinates: 9°47′33″N 122°27′6″E
- Interactive map of Sipalay Airport

Runways
| Direction | Length | | Surface |
| Direction | m | ft | Surface |
|---|---|---|---|
| 02/20 | 1,300 | 4,625 | Gravel |
- Sources: Aerial image of Sipalay Airport at WikiMapia

Sipalay Airport (Hiligaynon: Hulugpaan sang Sipalay; Filipino: Paliparan ng Sipalay), also known as San Jose Airstrip and formerly known as Maricalum Airstrip, is an airport serving the general area of the city of Sipalay, Negros Occidental, in the Philippines. It used to actively serve the private planes of mining companies present in the area. The airport serves occasional chartered planes en route to the commercial and private resorts in the area.

== History ==
Formerly owned by the Maricalum Mining Corporation, which shut down its copper mining operations in 1996, the airstrip was awarded to the City Government of Sipalay by a decision of the Regional Trial Court in Kabankalan, in the seat of Judge Henry Arles. In 2005, the City Council of Sipalay passed City Ordinance 2005-009 that laid down the expropriation of the property as an airport. The most notable guest to land in the airport was the private plane carrying then presidential candidate Gilbert Teodoro in 2010.

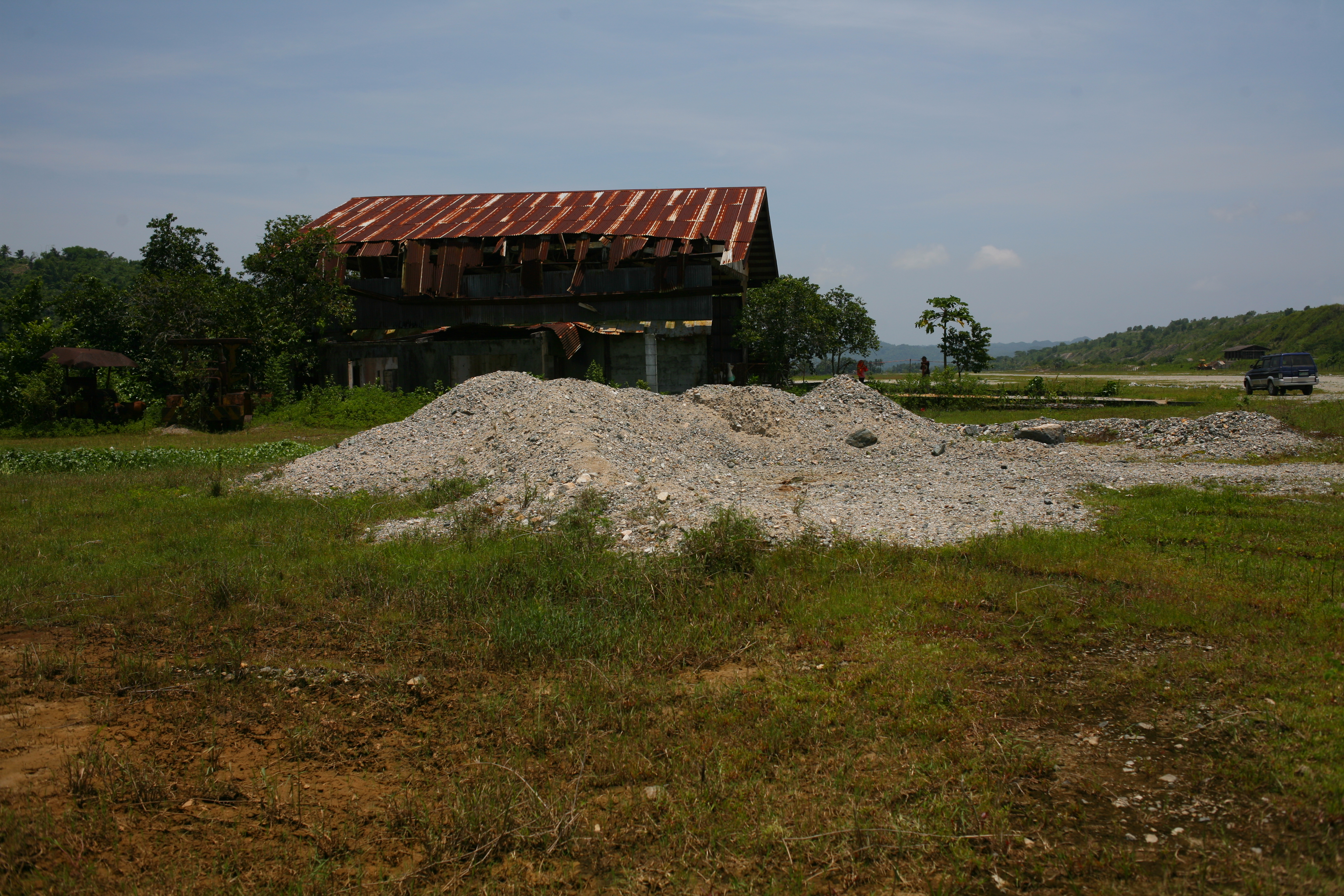
Former hangar of Sipalay Airport

== Current use ==
Most air traffic to the airport is controlled from Bacolod–Silay International Airport and usually hosts short flights from Bacolod or Dumaguete-Sibulan Airport. A resort diving facility uses the airport to service VIP guests from Bacolod or Dumaguete to Sipalay, and onward flights to Cagayancillo Airport in Palawan, using a 6-seater chartered Cessna. Air Juan serves as the first commercial flight in the airport.

== Commercial use ==
According to former Mayor, now Vice-Mayor, Oscar C. Montilla, the opening of the airport to commercial operations will boost the tourism initiative in southern Negros, adding further to the average of 50,000 tourists visiting the city alone. He further added last March 31, 2013 that SEAir has shown interest in operating charter flights to Sipalay. The airport will fulfill the role of a reliever airport mainly for the Kabankalan City Domestic Airport under construction.

In May 2012, Former Negros Occidental Vice-Governor Genaro Alvarez, a pilot by profession, said that in only a few days should commercial operations commence as the runway only needs a grader and road roller to clear the runway.

Commercial flights commenced August 3, 2017, served by Air Juan. However, flights were suspended on March 16, 2020, because of the COVID-19 global pandemic, which placed the entire country under lockdown. The airport was still served by Air Juan for evacuation flights of resident expatriates and tourists stranded in Sipalay, with seasonal flights from Manila and Cebu to serve locally stranded individuals to bypass Bacolod–Silay Airport.

== Airlines and destinations ==
| Airlines | Destinations |
|---|---|
| Air Juan | Cebu, Puerto Princesa |
