= Gerardo Alminaza =

Filipino bishop (born 1959)

The Most Reverend Gerardo A. Alminaza D.D.
- Bishop of San Carlos
- Province: Jaro
- See: San Carlos
- Appointed: September 14, 2013
- Installed: November 14, 2013
- Predecessor: Jose Advincula
- Previous posts: Auxiliary Bishop of Jaro (2008–2013); Titular Bishop of Maximiana in Byzacena (2008–2013)

Orders
- Ordination: April 29, 1986 by Antonio Fortich
- Consecration: August 4, 2008 by Angel Lagdameo

Personal details
- Born: Gerardo Alimane Alminaza; August 14, 1959 (age 67) San Jose, Sipalay, Negros Occidental, Philippines
- Denomination: Roman Catholic
- Residence: San Carlos, Negros Occidental, Philippines
- Education: University of Santo Tomas; Fordham University
- Motto: Sicut Christus Vivit
- Coat of arms: Gerardo A. Alminaza's coat of arms

Styles of Gerardo A. Alminaza
- Reference style: His Excellency; The Most Reverend
- Spoken style: Your Excellency
- Religious style: Bishop

Gerardo Alminaza (born August 14, 1959) is a Filipino bishop of the Roman Catholic Church who has been serving as the Bishop of the Diocese of San Carlos in the Philippines since 2013. He was previously an Auxiliary Bishop of Jaro and titular bishop of Maximiana in Byzacena from 2008 to 2013.

== Early life and education ==
Alminaza was born on August 4, 1959, in San Jose, Sipalay, Negros Occidental, Philippines, to Felix A. Alminaza and Antonia G. Alimane, both deceased. He studied philosophy at Sacred Heart Seminary in Bacolod and theology at the University of Santo Tomas in Manila, where he obtained a Licentiate in Sacred Theology. He pursued further studies at Fordham University in New York City, USA and earned a Doctorate in Educational Management from the University of Negros Occidental-Recoletos in Bacolod City.

== Priesthood ==
Alminaza was ordained a priest on April 29, 1986, for the Diocese of Bacolod. He initially served as Assistant Pastor at St. Francis Xavier Parish in Kabankalan. He later became dean of studies, Spiritual Director, and eventually Rector of Sacred Heart Seminary in Bacolod City. In addition, he held various administrative roles in the Diocesan Curia of Bacolod, including Chairman of the Diocesan Commission on Catechesis, Vice-Chancellor of the Diocese of Bacolod, and Chairman of the Commission on Clergy.

He also served as a formator at St. Joseph Regional Seminary in Jaro, Iloilo, and was a Spiritual Director and Pastoral Counselor for the Residency Program for the Young Clergy. Furthermore, he assisted the Intensive Renewal (AIR) Program for Priests under the Catholic Bishops' Conference of the Philippines (CBCP).

== Episcopal ministry ==
On May 29, 2008, Pope Benedict XVI appointed Alminaza as Auxiliary Bishop of Jaro and assigned him the Titular See of Maximiana in Byzacena. He was consecrated on August 4, 2008, by Archbishop Angel Lagdameo.

On September 14, 2013, Pope Francis appointed Alminaza as Bishop of the Diocese of San Carlos, transferring him from the titular see of Maximiana di Bizacena. He was installed on November 18, 2013.

Within CBCP, Alminaza held several key leadership roles. From 2011 to 2013, he served as vice-chairman of the Episcopal Commission on Seminaries. He was later appointed chairman of the same commission, a position he held from 2013 to 2019. From 2019 to 2021, he served as vice-chairman of the Commission on Social Action, Justice, and Peace. Additionally, he represented Visayas West as Regional Representative to the Permanent Council from 2009 to 2011.

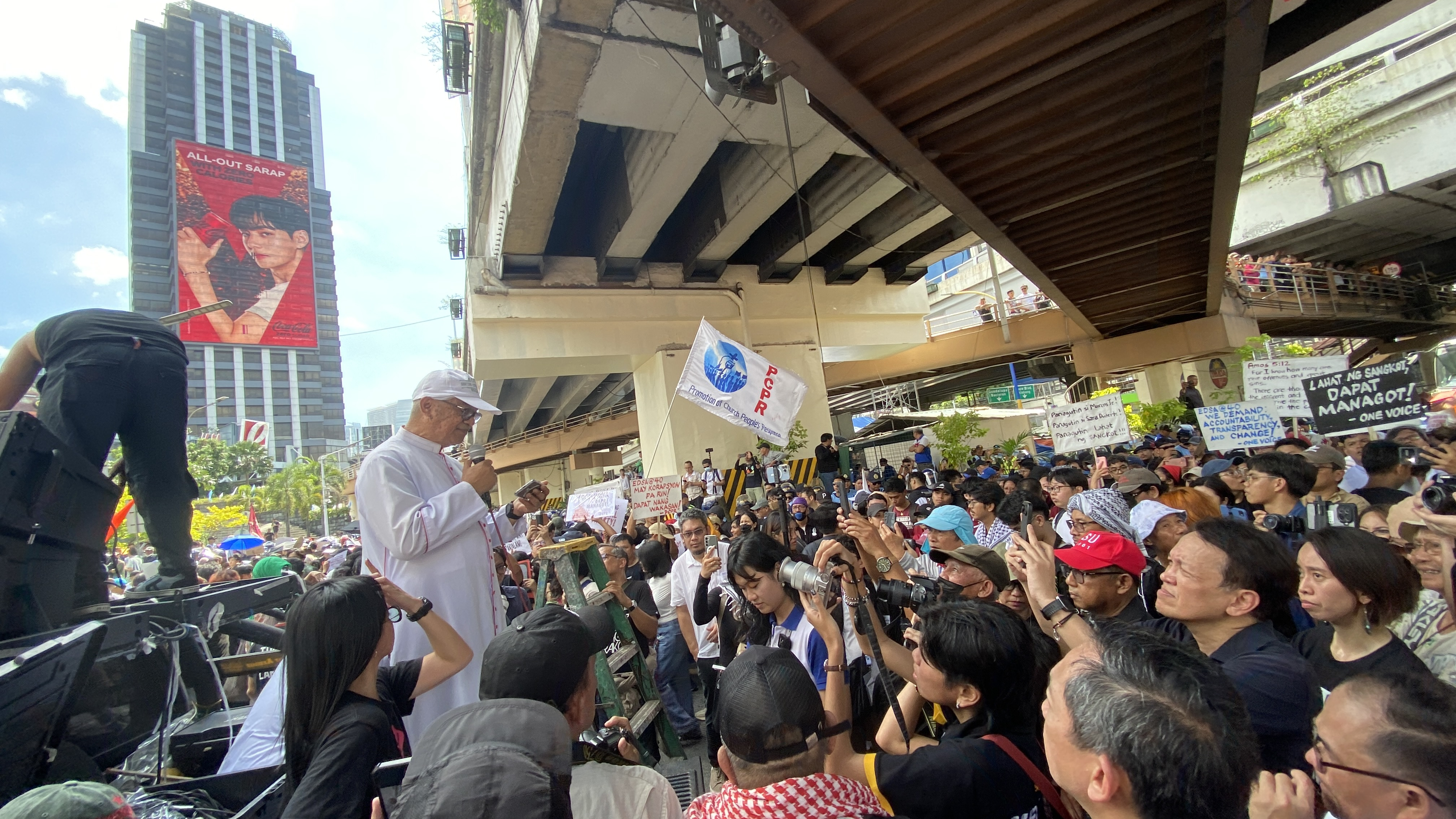
Speaking at the Baha Sa EDSA mobilization, part of the EDSA People Power 40th anniversary commemoration and Philippine anti-corruption protests.

Catholic Church titles
Preceded by Jose Advincula	Bishop of San Carlos; 2013–present	Incumbent
Preceded by Pierre Bürcher	Titular Bishop of Maximiana in Bizacena; 2008–2013	Succeeded by Tsegaye Keneni Derara
