= Sipalay =

Component city in Negros Occidental, Philippines

- Component city
- City of Sipalay
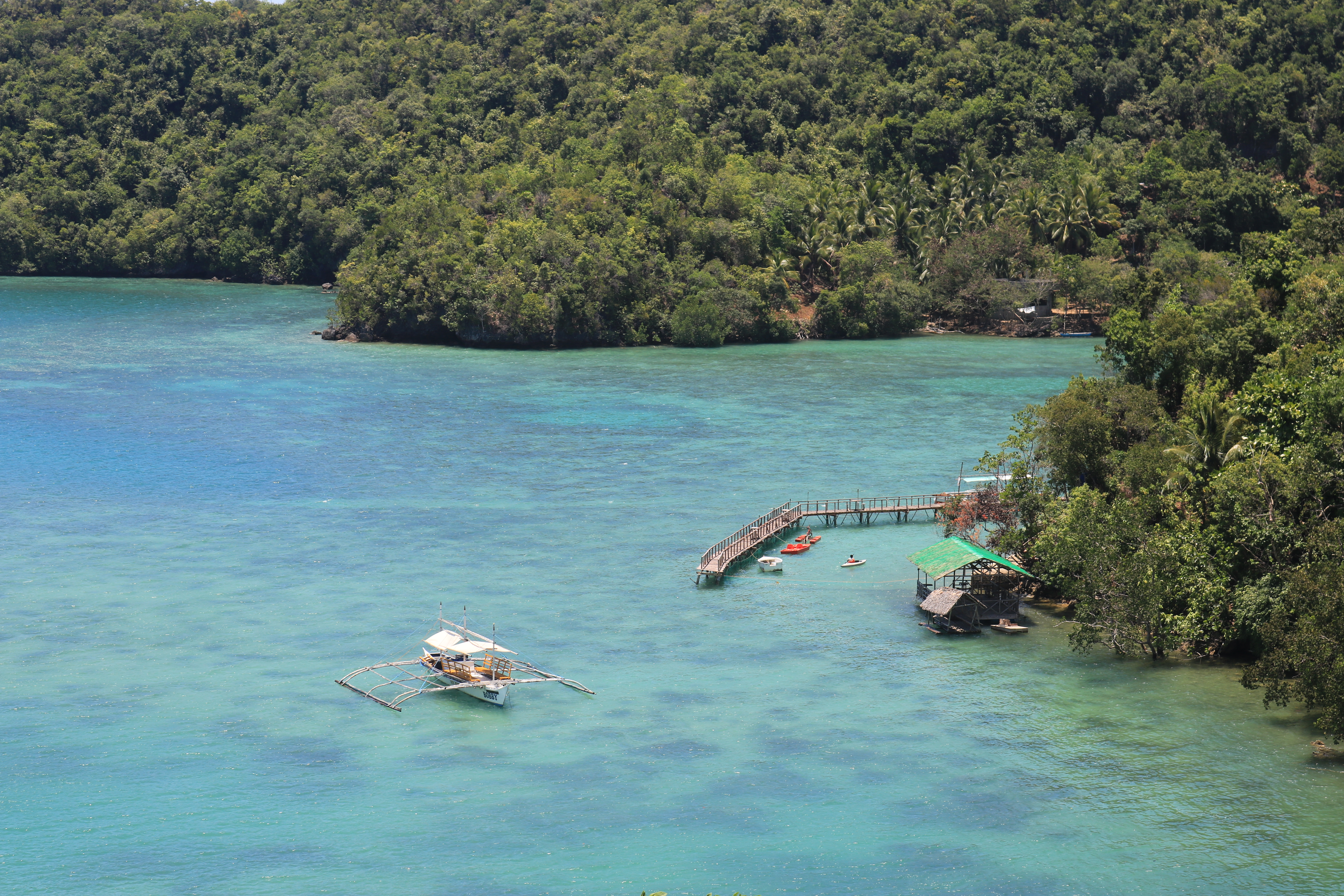
- Pump boat in Sipalay

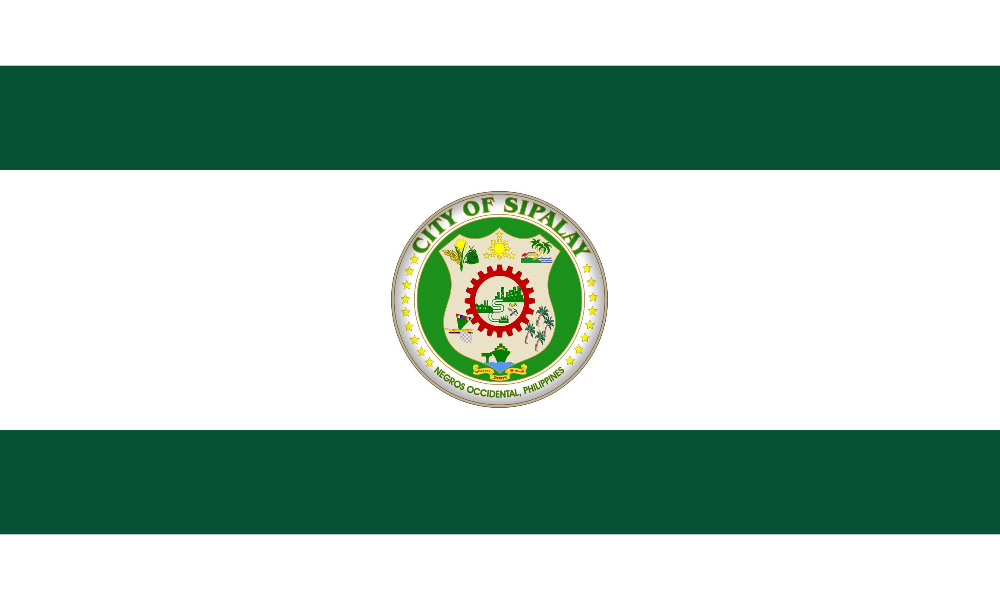
- Flag Seal
- Nickname: "The Jewel of the Sugar Island"
- Motto: "Ugyon Sipalaynon"
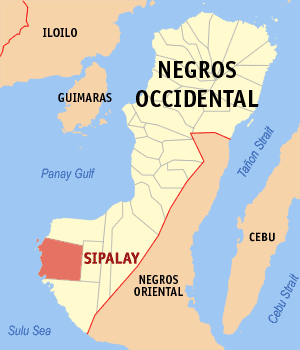
- Map of Negros Occidental with Sipalay highlighted
- Interactive map of Sipalay
- Location within the Philippines
- Coordinates: 9°45′N 122°24′E
- Country: Philippines
- Region: Negros Island Region
- Province: Negros Occidental
- District: 6th district
- Founded: December 20, 1948
- Cityhood: March 31, 2001
- Barangays: 17 (see Barangays)

Government
  - Type: Sangguniang Panlungsod
  - Mayor: Maria Gina Montilla-Lizares (NPC)
  - Vice Mayor: Oscar C. Montilla, Jr. (NPC)
  - Representative: Mercedes Alvarez (NPC)
  - City Council: Members: Dennis V. Galvan; Angelica G. Alvarez; Leslie C. Alejano; James Anthony M. Garrucho; Ulysses C. Hisona; Janewill L. Selga; Praem L. Mediodia; Rome A. Vargas; Claudio P. Bacatan; Annabelle C. Nobleza; Elir D. Borres ^{‡}; Pearl Ann C. Bloron ^{◌}; ‡ ex officio ABC president; ◌ ex officio SK chairman
  - Electorate: 48,864 voters (2025)

Area
  - Total: 379.78 km^{2} (146.63 sq mi)
- Elevation: 74 m (243 ft)
- Highest elevation: 549 m (1,801 ft)
- Lowest elevation: 0 m (0 ft)

Population (2024 census)
  - Total: 73,847
  - Density: 194.45/km^{2} (503.61/sq mi)
  - Households: 16,858

Economy
  - Income class: 3rd city income class
  - Poverty incidence: 33.56% (2023)
  - Revenue: ₱ 1,022 million (2024)
  - Assets: ₱ 2,652 million (2024)
  - Expenditure: ₱ 954.1 million (2024)
  - Liabilities: ₱ 720.9 million (2024)

Service provider
  - Electricity: Negros Occidental Electric Cooperative (NOCECO)
- Time zone: UTC+8 (PST)
- ZIP code: 6113
- PSGC: 064527000
- IDD : area code: +63 (0)034
- Native languages: Hiligaynon; Tagalog; Cebuano
- Website: www.sipalaycity.gov.ph

Sipalay, officially the City of Sipalay (Hiligaynon: Dakbanwa/Syudad sang Sipalay; Filipino: Lungsod ng Sipalay; Cebuano: Dakbayan sa Sipalay), is a component city in the province of Negros Occidental, Philippines. According to the 2024 census, it has a population of 73,847 people.

It is the top tourist destination in the province of Negros Occidental.

== History ==
Sipalay's history can be traced back to the undated time of early settlements of the native Tumandok who discovered the lowland plains very fertile, arable and fully vegetated by trees. The areas was well dissected by river tributaries, which accounted for the fertility of the lowland.

Records from the Spanish era suggest that the town had existed as early as 1618. During the Spanish era, the area was further discovered and developed by sailing adventurers from the neighboring island of Panay, being the group who resented the Kintos System enacted by the ruling Spaniards by then.

Growth and development flourished as Chinese merchants came to barter their wares with staple food, particularly rice, which was commonly called by the settlers as paray and by the Chinese, due to the difficulty of pronouncing r, as palay which was the word to have been popularly associated with the place. Thus the area came to be known as Sipalay.

At the advent of the American regime, Sipalay was a full pledge barrio of the Municipality of Cauayan. In the early 1920s the political structure was already in place.

During the World War II, Sipalay was made an emergency town and after the war. On November 20, 1948, then President Elpidio Quirino signed Executive Order No. 185 proclaiming Sipalay as a town. The official inauguration of the town was on December 20, 1948.

On November 8, 1963, Mayor Genaro Alvarez Sr. was about to run for a third term in the 1963 election when he was stabbed to death by an assailant, with his vice mayor Jesus Alejano Sr. briefly succeeding him. Police named Pedro Malbajor, a member of the Nacionalista team of the opponent to mayor Alvarez, as the prime suspect. Alvarez's wife Mercedes, a former beauty queen, ran for mayor in his stead, winning the election by a wide margin.

On January 3, 1988, former mayor Rodrigo Chua was running once again in the 1988 mayoral election when he was assassinated during a political rally in Barangay Mambaroto, being fatally shot in the chest by a lone gunman suspected to be from the New People's Army. His sister, Soledad Chua Montilla, ran in his stead and won.

=== Cityhood ===
The conversion of Sipalay into a component city of the Province of Negros Occidental followed in 2001 after the ratification of Republic Act No. 9027.

In October 2019, Vice Mayor Oscar Montilla was found guilty of corruption by the Fourth Division of the Sandiganbayan for neglecting to implement a suspension order against five city officials in 2005 while he was mayor. The Sandiganbayan later upheld its decision in January 2020, and Montilla was thus imprisoned and perpetually disqualified from holding public office.

== Geography ==
Sipalay's distance from Bacolod is 170 kilometres (110 mi) and 171 kilometres (106 mi) from Dumaguete, the capital of Negros Oriental. Public utility vehicles plying the southern Negros route pass by this city. Those coming from Negros Oriental can either exit through Kabankalan City via Mabinay or through Dumaguete via Hinoba-an.

=== Barangays ===
Sipalay City is politically subdivided into 17 barangays. Each barangay consists of puroks and some have sitios.

- Barangay 1 (Poblacion)
- Barangay 2 (Poblacion)
- Barangay 3 (Poblacion)
- Barangay 4 (Poblacion)
- Barangay 5 (Poblacion)
- Cabadiangan
- Camindangan
- Canturay
- Cartagena
- Cayhagan
- Gil Montilla
- Mambaroto
- Manlucahoc
- Maricalum
- Nabulao
- Nauhang
- San Jose

=== Climate ===
Climate data for Sipalay
Month	Jan	Feb	Mar	Apr	May	Jun	Jul	Aug	Sep	Oct	Nov	Dec	Year
Mean daily maximum °C (°F)	29 (84)	30 (86)	31 (88)	32 (90)	30 (86)	29 (84)	28 (82)	28 (82)	28 (82)	28 (82)	29 (84)	29 (84)	29 (85)
Mean daily minimum °C (°F)	21 (70)	21 (70)	22 (72)	23 (73)	24 (75)	24 (75)	24 (75)	24 (75)	24 (75)	24 (75)	23 (73)	22 (72)	23 (73)
Average precipitation mm (inches)	45 (1.8)	37 (1.5)	62 (2.4)	93 (3.7)	190 (7.5)	259 (10.2)	284 (11.2)	236 (9.3)	244 (9.6)	247 (9.7)	162 (6.4)	86 (3.4)	1,945 (76.7)
Average rainy days	10.8	8.4	12.7	16.3	26.7	28.5	29.1	28.0	27.4	28.5	23.4	15.5	255.3
Source: Meteoblue

== Demographics ==
Population census of Sipalay
Year	Pop.	±% p.a.
1960	20,325	—
1970	34,771	+5.51%
1975	45,773	+5.67%
1980	51,264	+2.29%
1990	61,892	+1.90%
1995	63,960	+0.62%
2000	62,063	−0.64%
2007	67,211	+1.11%
2010	67,403	+0.10%
2015	70,070	+0.74%
2020	72,448	+0.70%
2024	73,847	+0.46%
Source: Philippine Statistics Authority

=== Languages ===
Major dialects are Hiligaynon and Cebuano. English and Tagalog are also understood.

== Government ==
=== List of mayors ===
- Agripino Alvarez (1948–1955)
- Genaro P. Alvarez Sr. (1955–1963)
- Jesus P. Alejano Sr. (1963)
- Mercedes M. Alvarez (1963–1976)
- Rodrigo G. Chua (1976–1986)
- Soledad C. Montilla (1988–1998; 2007–2009)
- Oscar C. Montilla (1998–2007; 2009–2019)
- Maria Gina M. Lizares (2019–present)

== Economy ==
Poverty incidence of Sipalay (%)

Source: Philippine Statistics Authority

== Infrastructure ==
=== Transportation ===
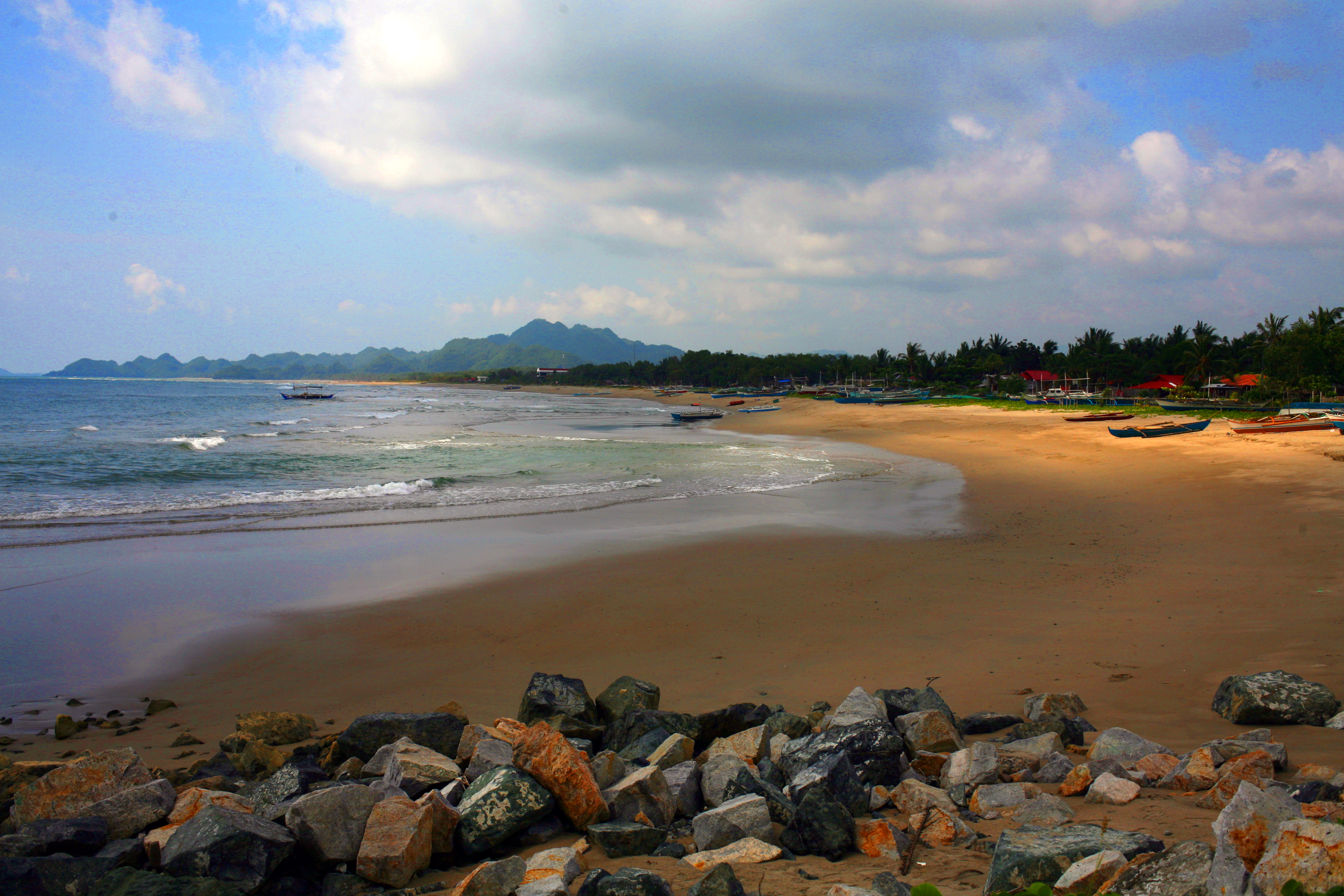
A Sipalay beach seashore

Airline company Air Juan offers services from Cebu, Iloilo, and Puerto Princesa via the Sipalay Airport.

== Tourism ==
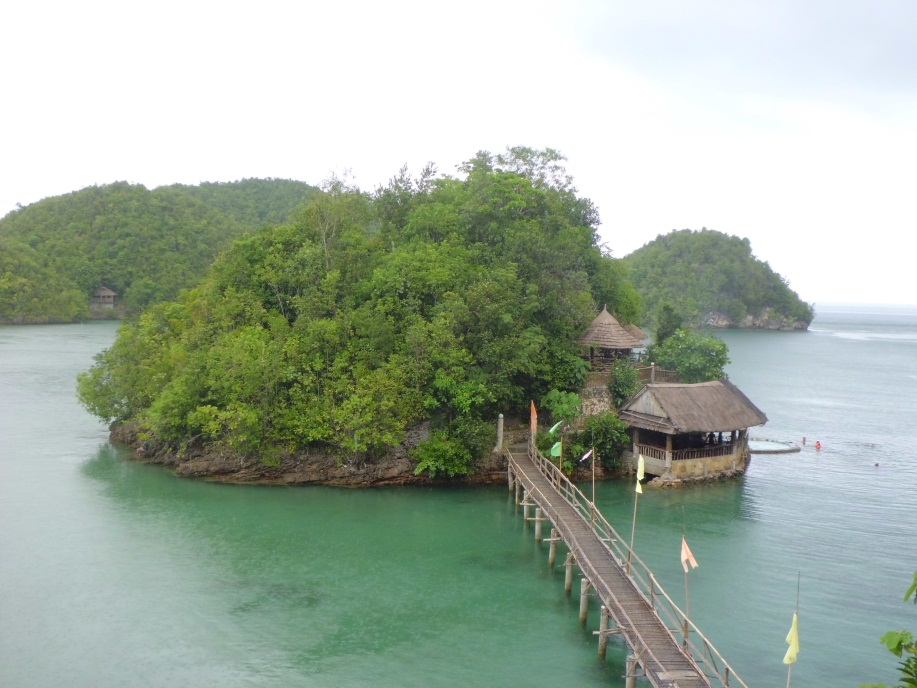
Top view image of Sipalay resorts

The city is known for its tourist destinations. An example of it is the now-defunct Maricalum Mining Corporation which happens to be one of the largest mining companies in the country. It now has a park dedicated for viewing the whole mine from atop.

Foreign and local tourists also flock its beaches the whole year round not only for swimming but for diving as well.

== Notable personalities ==
- Gary Alejano - Member of the Philippine House of Representatives for Magdalo Party-List, Captain in the Philippine Marine Corps
- Gerardo Alminaza - 3rd Bishop of the Diocese of San Carlos
- Mercedes Alvarez-Lansang - Member of the House of Representatives of the Philippines , Deputy Speaker of the House of Representatives of the Philippines
- Sue Ramirez - Film and Television actress
