= SaCaSol I =

Solar photovoltaic power plant in San Carlos, Negros

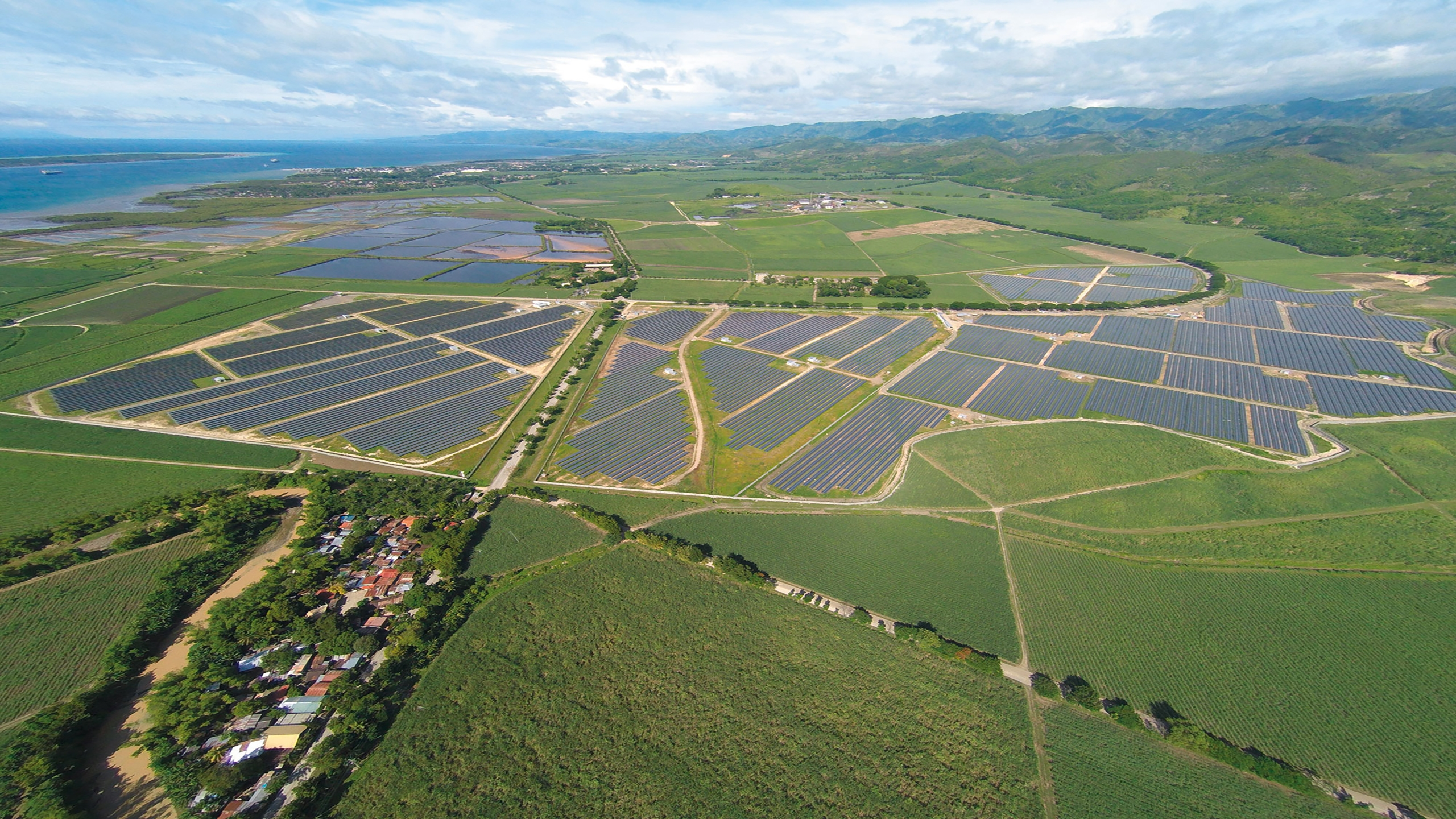
- Country: Philippines
- Location: San Carlos, Negros Occidental
- Coordinates: 10.5158°N 123.4351°E
- Status: Operational
- Commission date: May 15, 2014
- Owner: San Carlos Solar Energy

Solar farm
- Type: Flat-panel PV
- Site area: 66 ha (163 acres)

Power generation
- Nameplate capacity: 45 MW
- Annual net output: 31,61 GWh (planned)

External links
- Website: www.sacasol.com

The San Carlos Solar Energy Inc. (SaCaSol) I is a 22 megawatt (MW) solar photovoltaic power plant in San Carlos, Negros Occidental. It is currently the largest operational solar plant in the Philippines

SaCaSol I is a 45-megawatt (MW) photovoltaic power plant, owned by San Carlos Solar Energy Inc. (SaCaSol), and located in San Carlos, Negros Occidental, Philippines. At the time of grid connection, it is the largest solar plant in the Philippines and the country’s first utility-scale, privately financed solar power plant. The first phase, the 13 MWp SaCaSol I A, was inaugurated by the country's president, Benigno S. Aquino III, on May 15, 2014. The second phase, the 9 MWp SaCaSol I B, is in operation since July 2014. The third and fourth phase, SaCaSol I C and SaCaSol I D, are operational since August, 2015.

At the Asian Power Award 2014, SaCaSol I was designated as the Solar Power Project of the Year, silver level.
