= Maximiana in Byzacena =

Africa Proconsularis (125 AD)

Maximiana in Byzacena (Italian : Massimiana di Bizacena ) is a titular bishopric of the Roman Catholic Church . It goes back to a former bishopric in the Roman province of Byzacena or Africa proconsularis in the Sahel region of Tunisia.

The cathedra of the diocese was in a town of the Roman Empire called Maximiana, one of several towns by this name in Roman North Africa. The exact location of this Maximiana is unknown, but it was somewhere near Sousse. It was a Civitas of the Roman Province of Africa Proconsularis, and in late Antiquity the province of Byzacena, in modern Sahel region of Tunisia.

The current bishop of Maximiana in Byzacena is Tsegaye Keneni Derara of Ethiopia.
