= Romblon Cathedral =

Roman Catholic church in Romblon, Philippines

- Saint Joseph Cathedral Parish
- Katedral ni San Jose (Romblomanon); Catedral Parroquial de San José (Spanish); Katedral ng San Jose (Filipino)
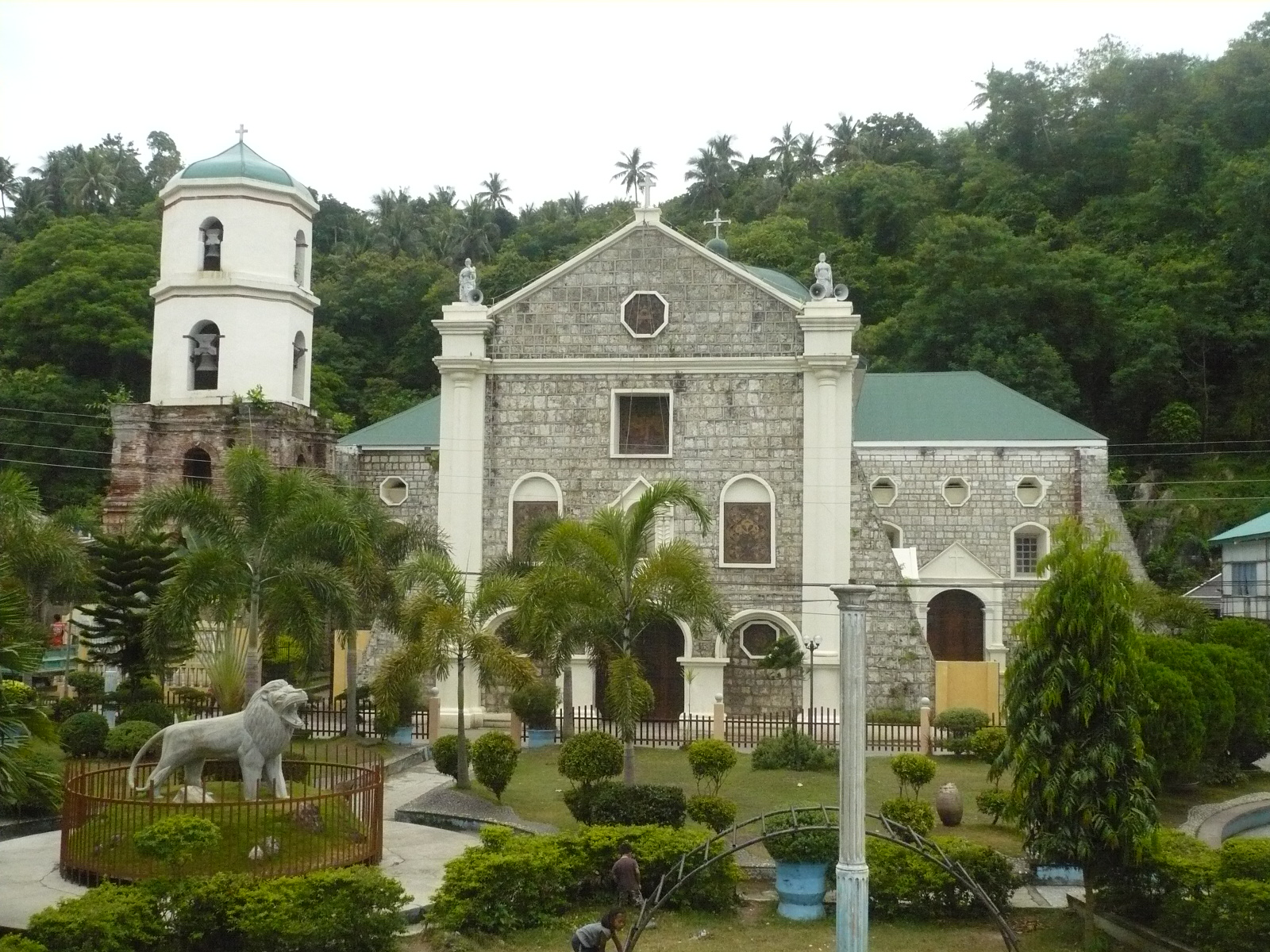
- Romblon Cathedral in 2012

- Location within Luzon Location within Philippines
- 12°34′33″N 122°16′10″E
- Location: Romblon, Romblon
- Country: Philippines
- Denomination: Roman Catholic

History
- Status: Cathedral
- Founded: 1635
- Dedication: Saint Joseph
- Dedicated: 1644

Architecture
- Functional status: Active
- Heritage designation: National Cultural Treasure
- Architectural type: Church building
- Style: Baroque, Fortress church

Administration
- Archdiocese: Capiz
- Diocese: Romblon

Clergy
- Bishop: Narciso Villaver Abellana

Saint Joseph Cathedral Parish, commonly known as Romblon Cathedral, is a Roman Catholic cathedral in Romblon town, in the province of Romblon, Philippines. One of the province's known landmarks, it is the seat of the Diocese of Romblon and was declared a National Cultural Treasure in 2001 by the National Museum of the Philippines.

== History ==
In 1631, the Christian community in Romblon island where the cathedral stands today was formally organized. The island faced the same fate with the adjacent Tablas, Sibuyan and nearby Marinduque, having been frequented by Moro raiders from the south. When the Portuguese Recollect friar Agustin de San Pedro from Cagayan de Misamis in Mindanao was transferred to Romblon in 1644, he immediately spearheaded the construction of the Romblon's church and belfry due to the said raid attacks. Also because of the attacks, he trained the natives to defend themselves with military armaments and ordered constructions of structures that fortified the island, earning him the moniker "El Padre Capitan". Constructions of the Fuerza San Andres and Fuerza Santiago overlooking the town in 1644, Banton's church and convent including its perimeter walls, and the fortress at Banton's hills, were all under his helm. The church's rear side was placed against the mountainside for stability while the front of the bay inlet facing the town was constructed with a continuous wall-gate for protection.

The first decades of the 18th century saw most of the constructions that comprise the cathedral today. In 1726, the retablo mayor was built, alongside the two smaller retablos facing each other at the transept. Another level of the belfry was added in the following year, 1727. Romblon received a replica image of the famed Cebu Santo Niño and enshrined it in the church in 1728. The church and its parts were damaged caused by typhoons in 1780 and 1829, which were all rebuilt and reconstructed throughout the 19th century.

In 1974, the church of Romblon became a cathedral when the Diocese of Romblon was founded. In 1992, the cathedral-enshrined image of Santo Niño de Romblon went missing and was returned to Romblon in 2013. The cathedral was installed with its National Cultural Treasure marker in 2013 even though it was designated as such in 2001.

On May 27, 2023, a "tragic" fire engulfed the Cathedral's L-shaped convent, parish office and rectory, "except for the old stone pillars", Bishop Narciso Villaver Abellana said. It served as a repository-temporary museum of religious treasures, including canonical books, records and antique wooden statues of Spanish-era Christian saints.

== Gallery ==
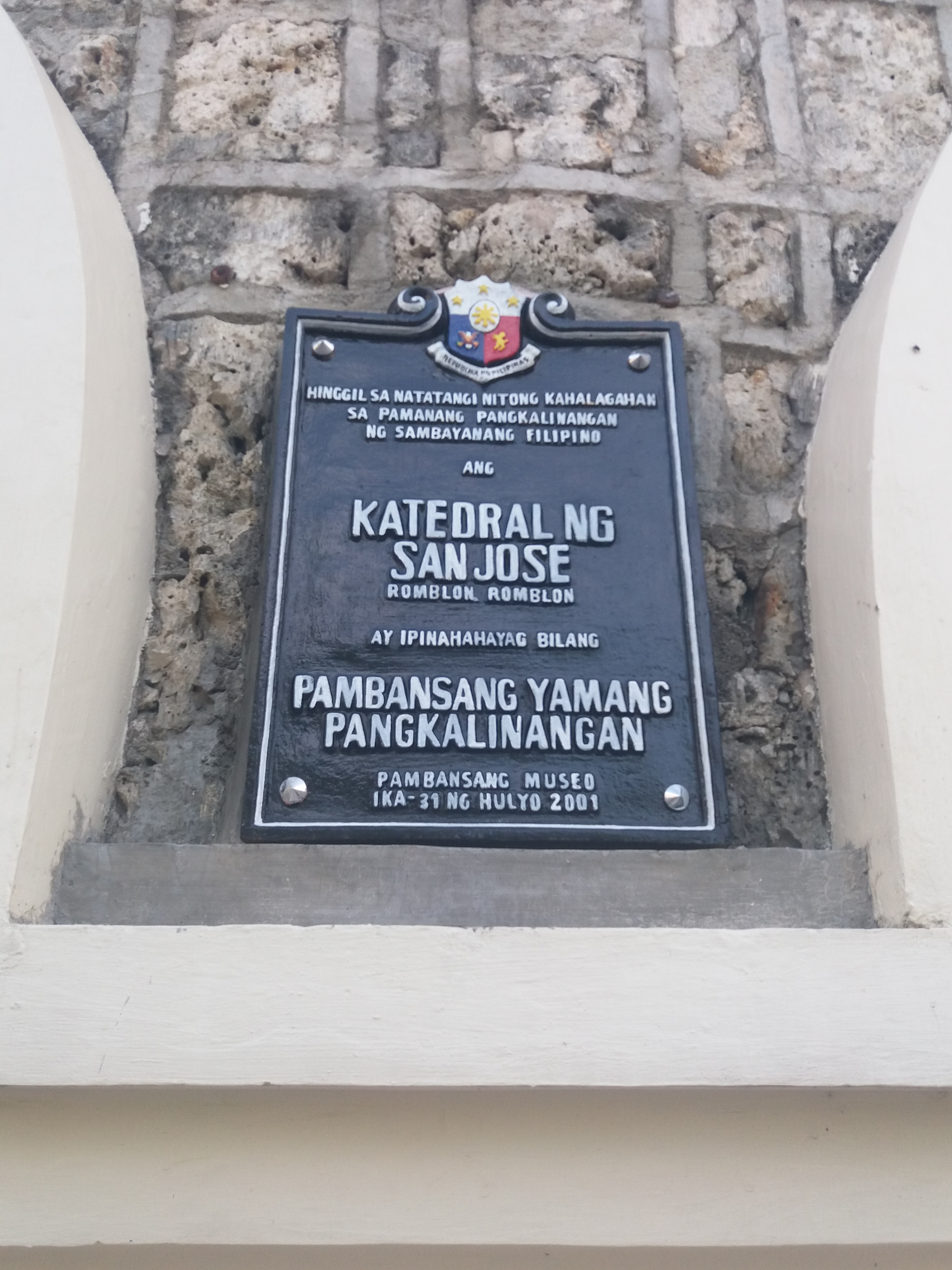
National Cultural Treasure marker

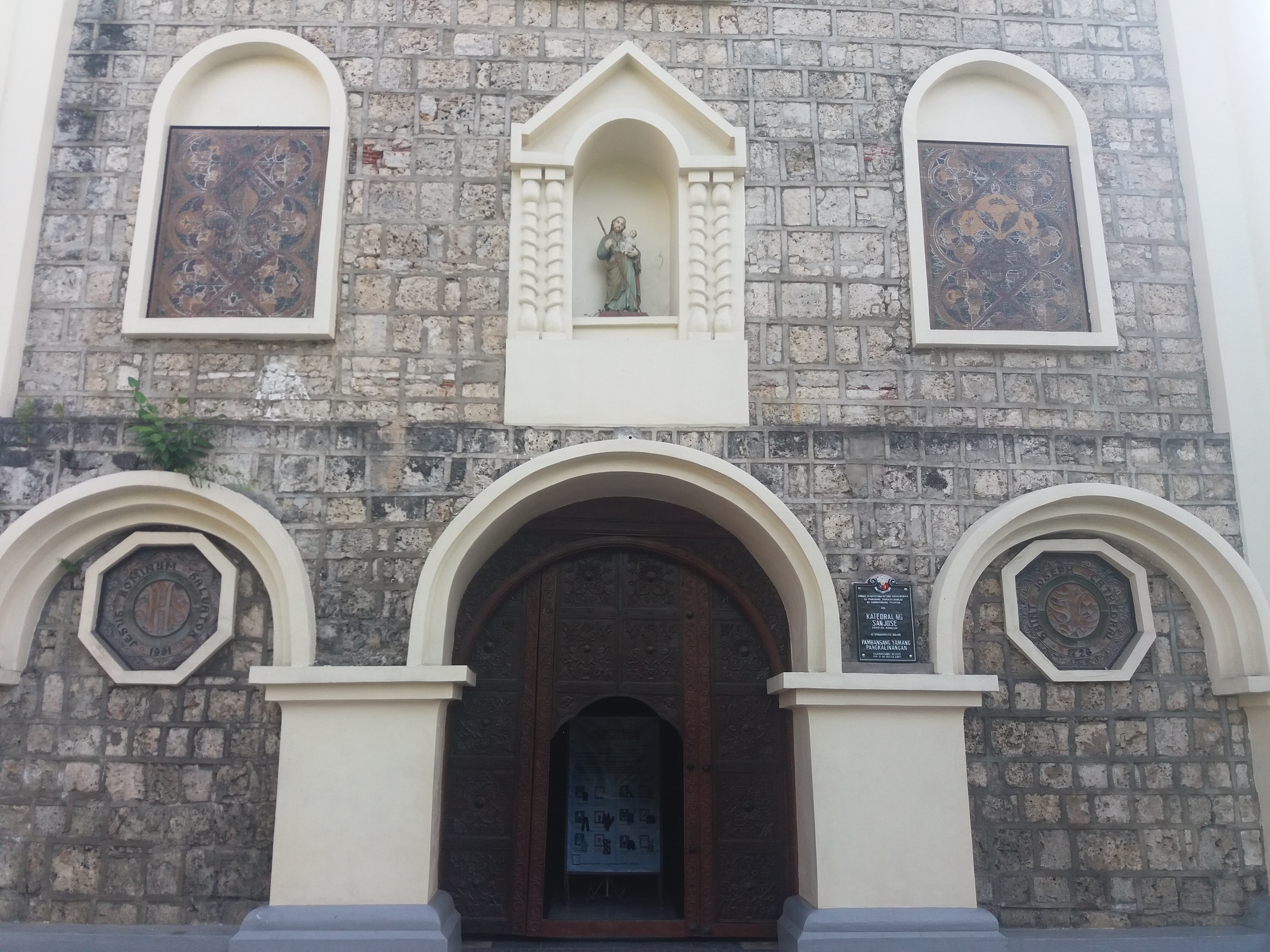
Archways at the cathedral's facade

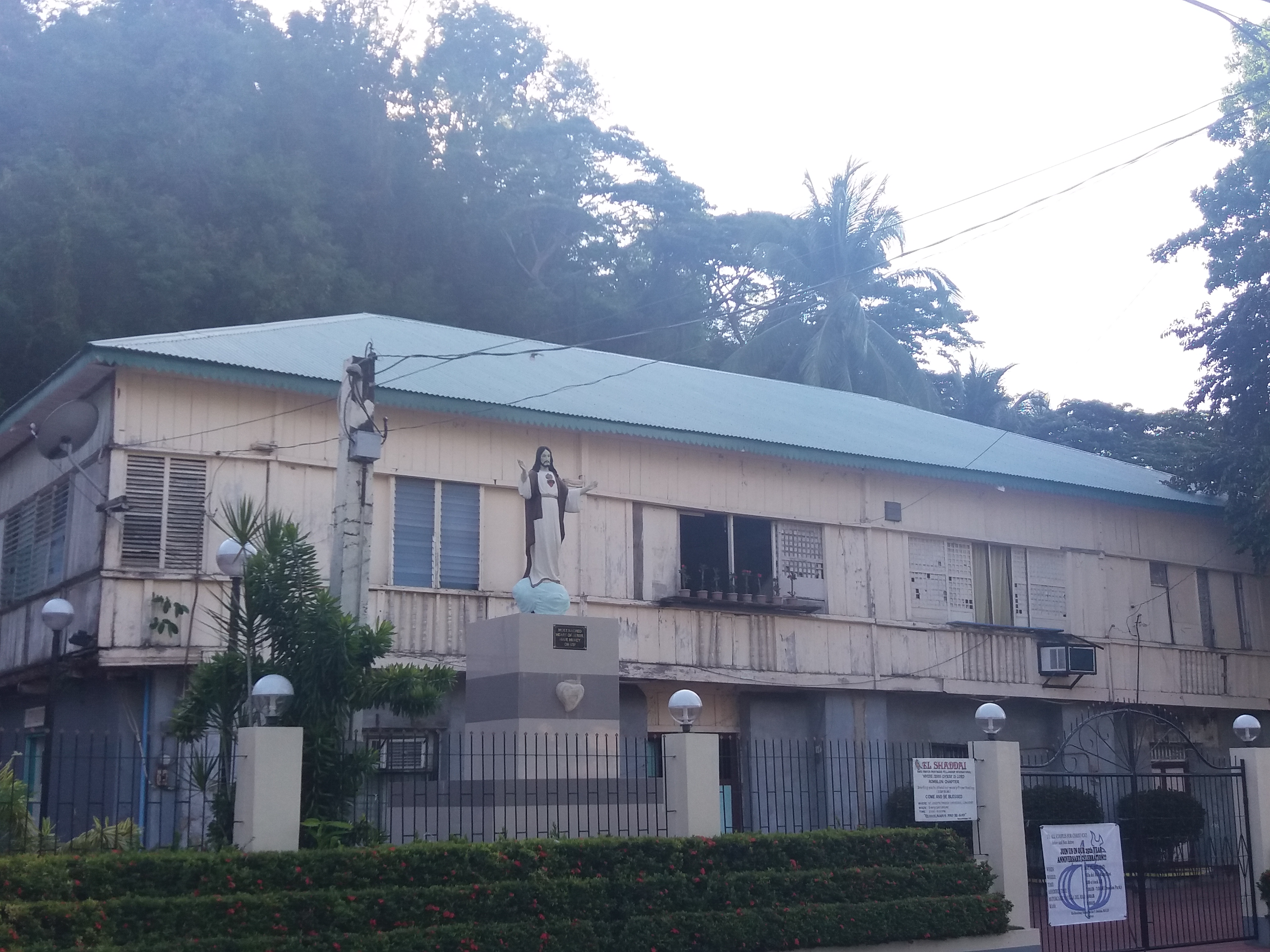
Romblon Cathedral convent

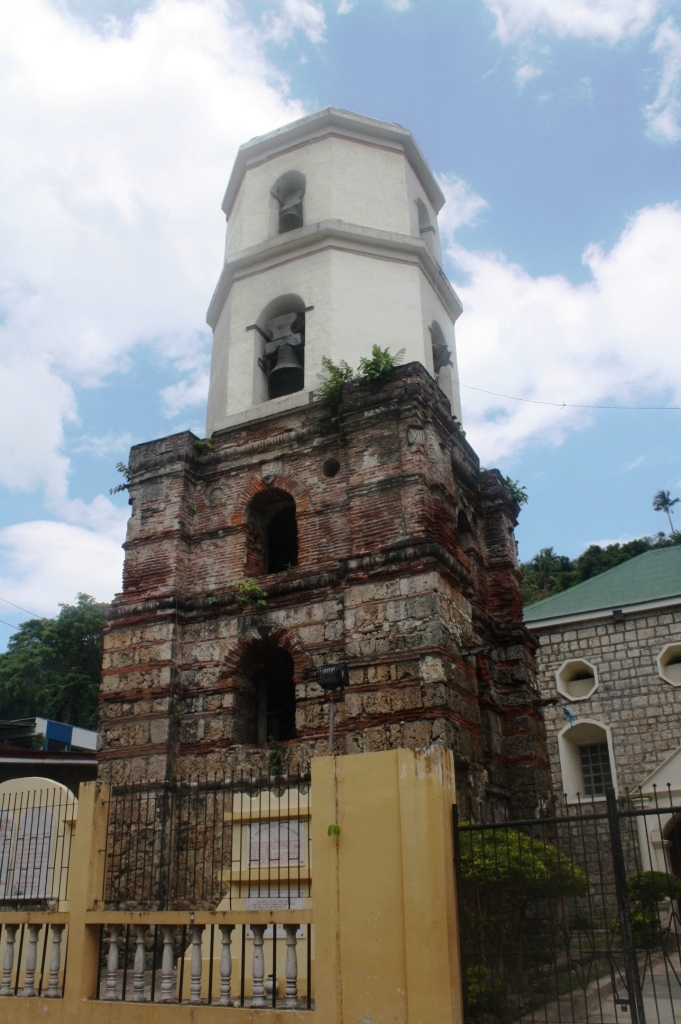
The cathedral's belfry

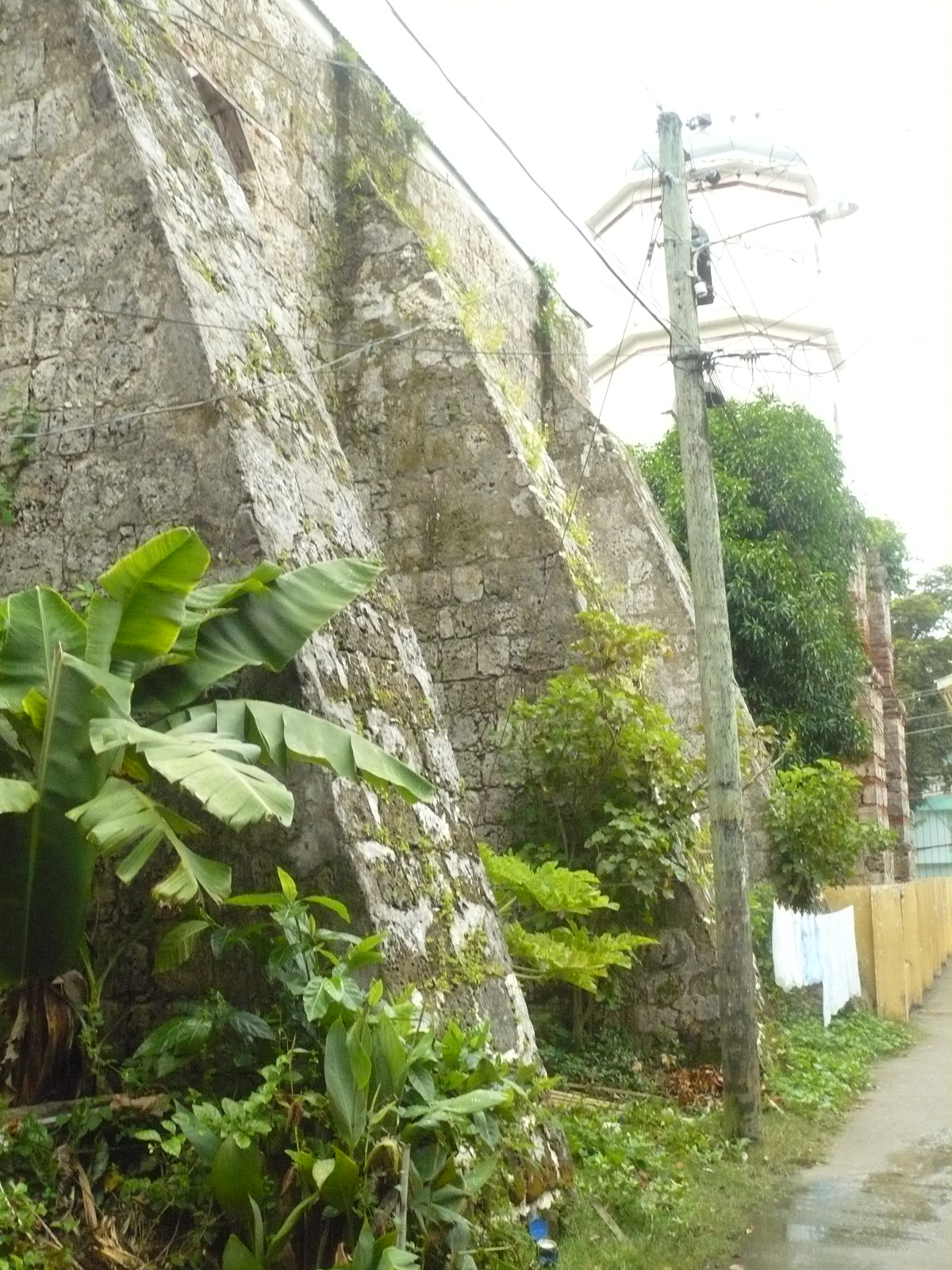
Buttresses at the cathedral's lateral wall

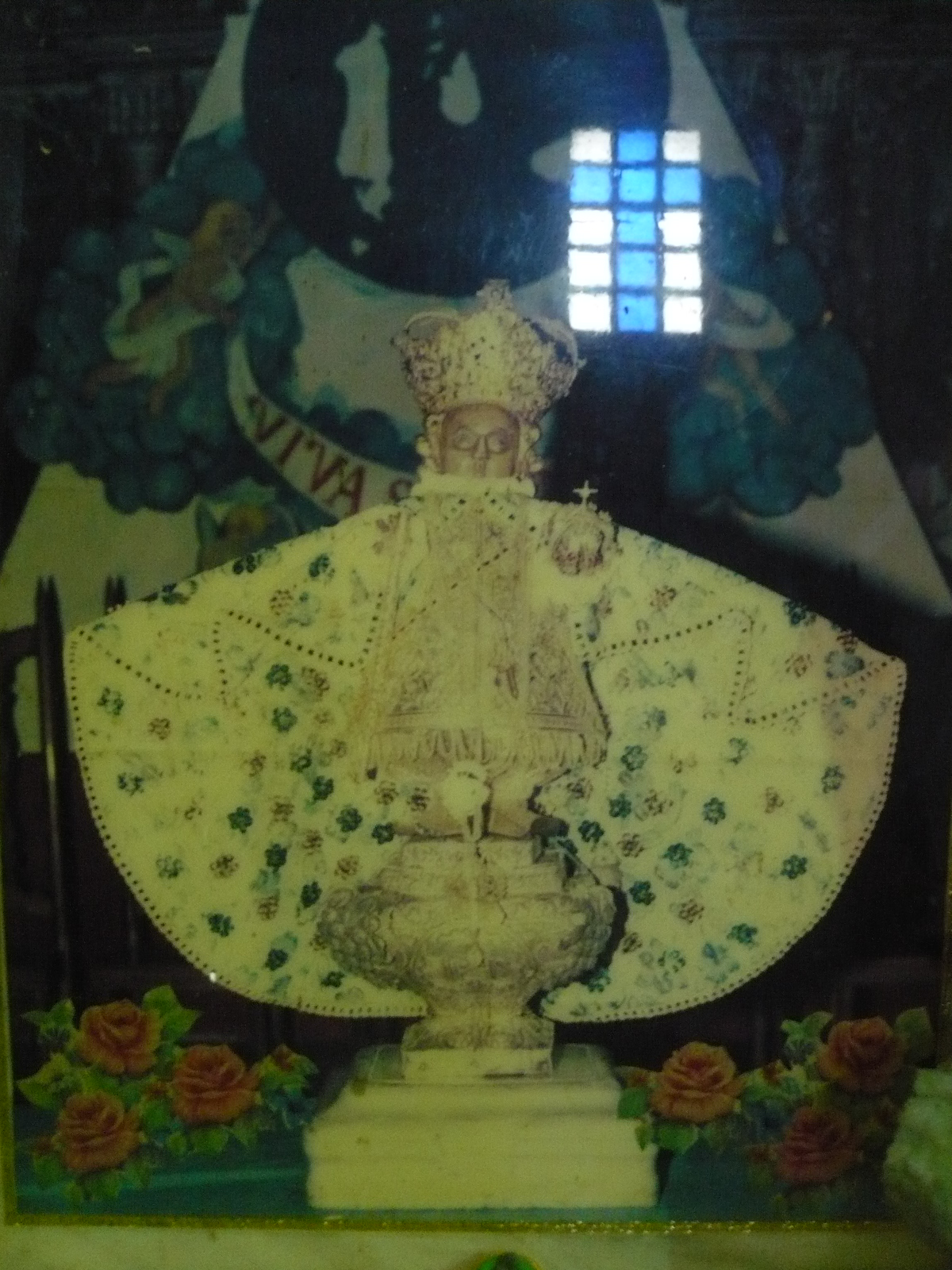
Laminated image of Sto. Niño de Romblon that was lost for almost 22 years

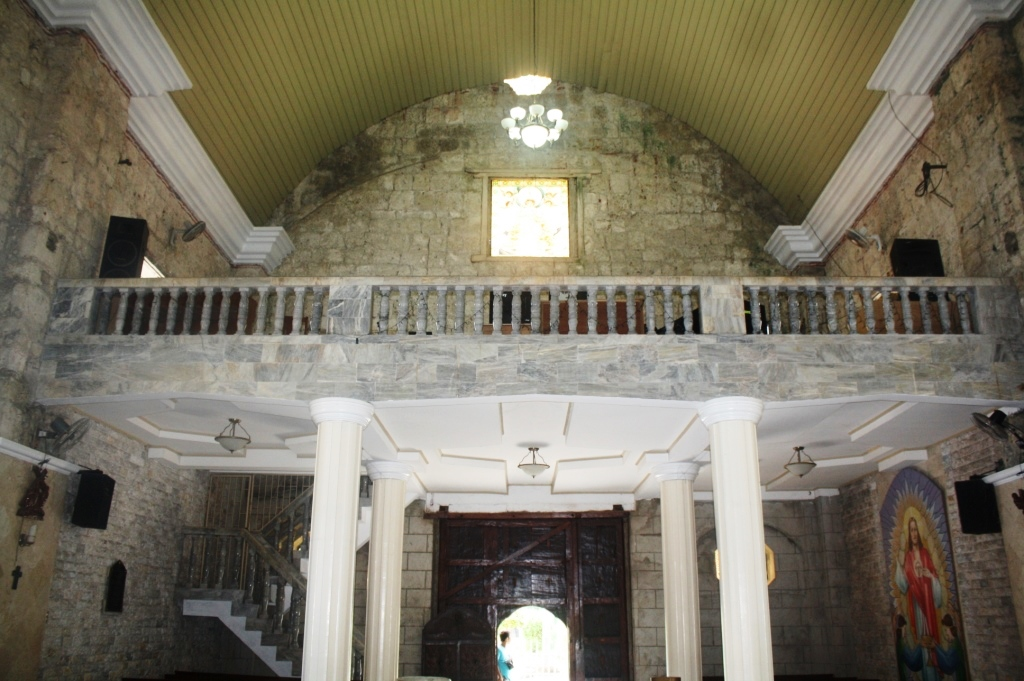
The cathedral's choir loft

Altar retablo
