= Vicente Salgado y Garrucho =

Filipino Roman Catholic bishop

His Excellency The Most Reverend Vicente Salgado y Garrucho
- Roman Catholic Bishop of Romblon
- Church: Roman Catholic
- Province: Capiz
- Diocese: Roman Catholic Diocese of Romblon
- Appointed: 30 May 1988
- Installed: 30 May 1988
- Term ended: 30 January 1997
- Predecessor: Nicolas M. Mondejar
- Successor: Arturo Mandin Bastes, S.V.D.

Orders
- Ordination: 25 July 1988
- Rank: bishop

Personal details
- Born: 20 April 1936 Bacolod, Negros Occidental
- Died: 9 April 2005 (aged 68)
- Denomination: Roman Catholicism
- Coat of arms

Styles of Vicente Salgado y Garrucho
- Reference style: The Most Reverend
- Spoken style: Your Excellency

Vicente Salgado y Garrucho (born 20 April 1936 Manila – 9 April 2005) was a Filipino Roman Catholic bishop and the second Bishop of Romblon succeeding His Most Reverend Nicolas M. Mondejar in 1988.

== Life ==
Vicente Salgado y Garrucho received on 23 December 1961, the priestly ordination. On 30 May 1988, he was appointed by Pope John Paul II Bishop of Romblon. The Apostolic Nuncio to the Philippines, Bruno Torpigliani, consecrated him on 25 July of the same year. Co-consecrators were Alberto Jover Piamonte, archbishop of Jaro and Antonio Yapsutco Fortich, Bishop of Bacolod. On 30 January 1997 the Pope accepted his age-related resignation.

== Death ==
At the age of 69 years he died on 9 April 2005.

== See also ==
- Narciso Villaver Abellana
- Nicolas M. Mondejar
- Bishop of Romblon
- Roman Catholic Diocese of Romblon

Catholic Church titles
Preceded by Nicolas M. Mondejar	Bishop of Romblon; 1988 – 1997	Succeeded by Arturo Mandin Bastes, S.V.D.
