= Bishop of Romblon =

- Bishopric

Catholic
- Incumbent: Narciso Abellana

Location
- Ecclesiastical province: Capiz

Information
- First holder: Nicolas M. Mondejar
- Established: 19 December 1974
- Diocese: Romblon
- Cathedral: St. Joseph's Cathedral

The Bishop of Romblon is the Ordinary of the Roman Catholic Diocese of Romblon in the Ecclesiastical Province of Capiz, Philippines. The current bishop is Narciso Abellana y Villaver. The local church of the Diocese of Romblon has shown tremendous growth since its erection in April 1974. Although the local situation is characterized by massive poverty because a majority of its people are poor fisher folk and marginalized farmers, the resources and strength of the Romblomanons, as the native inhabitants are called, have come to the fore to solve the vital problems that beset the diocese.

Romblon is a province composed of 20 islands and islets surrounded by deep waters in the Western Visayas region known as Region IV. Its three main islands – Tablas, Sibuyan and Romblon lie between the western tip of Panay Island and the end of the Bondoc Peninsula in Luzon. The Sibuyan Sea surrounds and separates them from the mainland of Luzon and the rest of the Visayas.

== Bishops of Romblon ==
Bishops of Romblon
From	Until	Incumbent	Notes
19 December 1974	21 November 1987	Nicolas M. Mondejar	Ilonggo appointed Bishop of Romblon in 1974 and appointed Bishop of San Carlos, Negros Occidental in 1987
30 May 1988	30 January 1997	Vicente Salgado y Garrucho	Appointed bishop on 30 May 1988 and resigned office on 30 January 1997
3 July 1997	25 July 2002	Arturo Mandin Bastes, S.V.D.	Appointed Bishop of Romblon on 3 July 1997 and was appointed Coadjutor Bishop of Sorsogon on 25 Jul 2002
11 June 2003	25 May 2011	Jose Corazon Tumbagahan Tala-oc	Appointed bishop on 11 June 2003 was appointed Bishop of Kalibo on 25 May 2011
15 October 2013	incumbent	Narciso Villaver Abellana, M.S.C.	Native of Talisay, Cebu and current bishop of Romblon

== See also ==
- Catholic Church in the Philippines
