= Arturo Bastes =

Filipino Roman Catholic bishop (1944–2024)

The Most Reverend Arturo Mandin Bastes SVD, D.D.
- Bishop Emeritus of Sorsogon
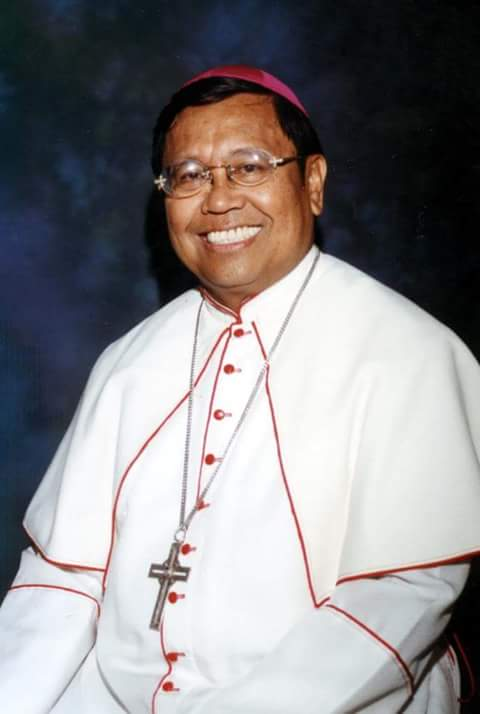
- Bishop Arturo Mandin Bastes, SVD Portrait from CBCP News
- Church: Roman Catholic
- Province: Caceres
- Diocese: Sorsogon
- Appointed: July 25, 2002 (Coadjutor)
- Installed: April 16, 2003
- Retired: October 15, 2019
- Predecessor: Jesus Varela
- Successor: Jose Alan Dialogo
- Previous post: Bishop of Romblon (1997–2002)

Orders
- Ordination: November 28, 1970 by Paul VI
- Consecration: August 21, 1997 by Ricardo Vidal

Personal details
- Born: Arturo Mandin Bastes; April 1, 1944 Loboc, Bohol, Japanese-occupied Philippines
- Died: October 20, 2024 (aged 80) Cainta, Rizal, Philippines
- Motto: Gressus Meos Diriget "He will guide my steps"

Styles of Arturo Mandin Bastes
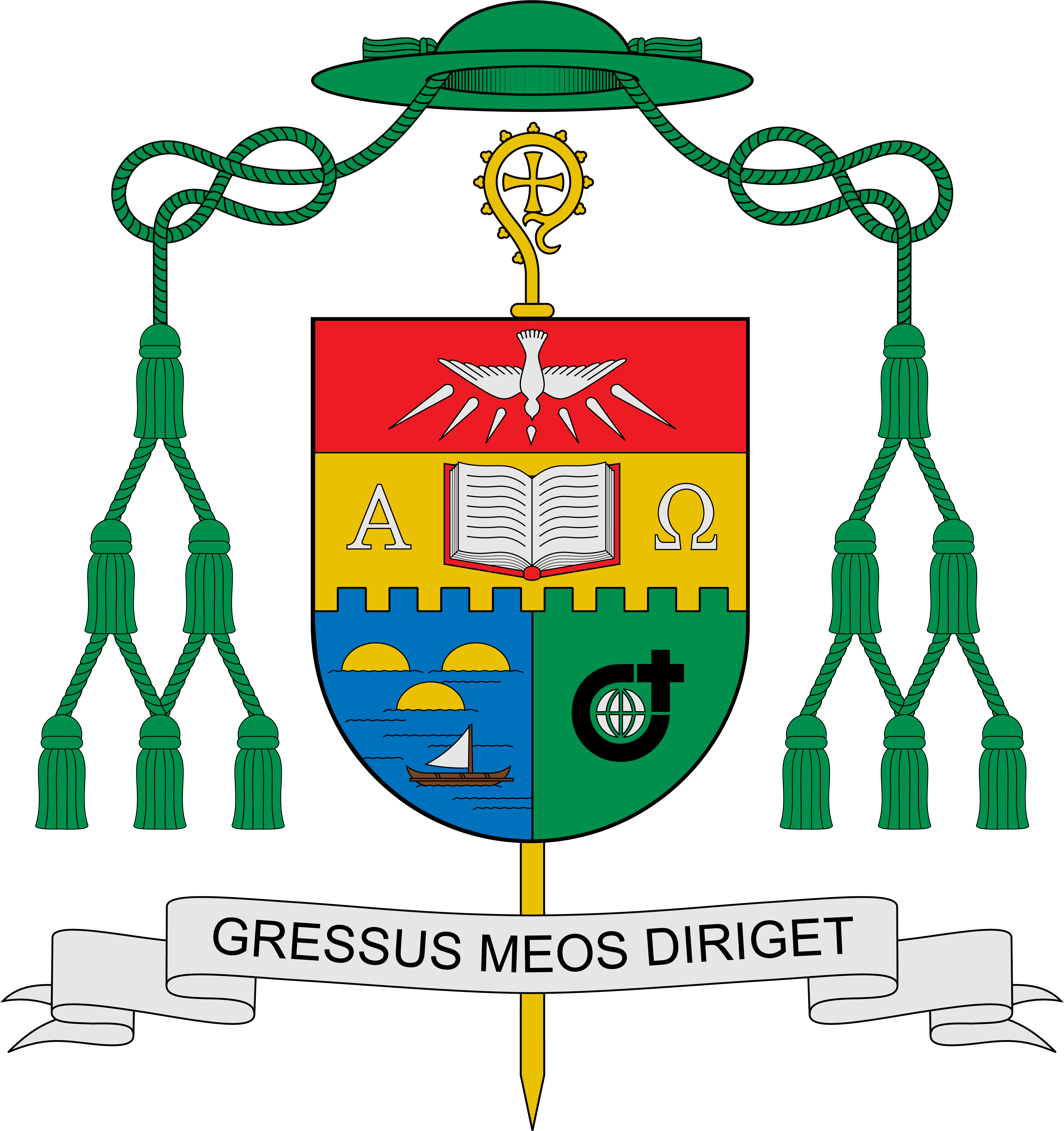
- Reference style: Most Reverend
- Spoken style: Your Excellency
- Religious style: Bishop

Arturo Mandin Bastes (April 1, 1944 – October 20, 2024) was a Filipino Catholic prelate who served as Bishop of Sorsogon from 2003 to 2019.

== Ministry ==
He was first ordained a priest of Society of the Divine Word (SVD) on November 28, 1970, in Rizal Park.

Pope John Paul II appointed him Bishop of Romblon on July 3, 1997. His episcopal ordination was on August 21, 1997, in Cebu City. The pope nominated him Coadjutor Bishop in the Diocese of Sorsogon on July 25, 2002. On April 17, 2003 (Holy Thursday), he succeeded as Bishop of Sorsogon. He also served as chairman and president of the Philippine Bible Society in 2008. In 2016, Bishop Bastes initiated the launch of a campaign in a bid to allot 20% of government resources to an anti-poverty fund or Serendipity fund, according to the CBCP.

== Later life and death ==
Pope Francis accepted his retirement as Bishop of Sorsogon on October 15, 2019, and appointed as his Jose Alan Dialogo successor.

Bastes died on October 20, 2024, at the age of 80.

Catholic Church titles
| Preceded by Vicente Salgado y Garrucho | Bishop of Romblon; July 3, 1997 – July 25, 2002 | Succeeded by Jose Corazon Tala-oc |
| Preceded by Jesus Yu Varela | Bishop of Sorsogon; April 17, 2003 – October 15, 2019 | Succeeded by Jose Alan V. Dialogo |
