= Nicolas M. Mondejar =

Filipino Roman Catholic bishop (1924–2019)

The Most Reverend Nicolas M. Mondejar
- Bishop Emeritus of Diocese of San Carlos
- Church: Catholic
- Province: Roman Catholic Archdiocese of Jaro
- Diocese: Roman Catholic Diocese of San Carlos
- See: San Carlos
- Appointed: 21 November 1987
- Installed: 10 February 1988
- Term ended: 25 July 2001
- Predecessor: New creation
- Successor: Jose Advincula
- Other posts: Asst. editor of Veritas, Jaro, Iloilo City, 1953-1957; Asst. parish priest, La Paz, Iloilo City1953-1957; Psychiatric social worker and marriage counsellor, Catholic Charities, Brooklyn, New York, 1959-1961; Representative of the Diocesan Catholic Charities to the Domestic 1961-1962; Relations Court, Brooklyn, New York 1961-1962; Youth Counsellor, Lincoln Hall, New York, 1963-1965; Psychiatric social worker, Catholic Charities, Brooklyn, New York, 1965-1969; Auxiliary bishop, Cebu, 1970-1975; Chairman, NASSA, CBCP, 1976-1980
- Previous posts: Auxiliary Bishop of Cebu and Bishop of Romblon

Orders
- Consecration: August 30, 1970 by Archbishop Carmine Rocco and co-Consecrated Bishop Antonio Frondosa and Bishop Manuel Sandalo Salvador
- Rank: Bishop

Personal details
- Born: Nicolas Mollenedo Mondejar; 15 September 1924 Cabatuan, Iloilo, Philippine Islands
- Died: 10 February 2019 (aged 94) San Carlos, Negros Occidental, Philippines
- Buried: San Carlos Borromeo Cathedral and Parish, San Carlos, Negros Occidental, Philippines
- Denomination: Roman Catholicism
- Coat of arms

Styles of Nicolas Mondejar
- Reference style: The Most Reverend
- Spoken style: Your Excellency

Nicolas Mollenedo Mondejar (15 September 1924 – 10 February 2019) was a Filipino Catholic bishop. He was the first bishop of the newly created Diocese of Romblon from 1974 to 1987 after his appointment to the Bishop of San Carlos, Negros Occidental. He later became its bishop-emeritus.

== Life and career ==
Nicolas Mollenedo Mondejar was born on 15 September 1924 in the municipality of Cabatuan in Iloilo in the Philippines. He was ordained a priest on 4 April 1953 in San Miguel, Mandaluyong, Metro Manila. Seventeen years later he was ordained a bishop, on 30 August 1970 in Jaro, Iloilo.

Mondejar died on 10 February 2019, aged 94.

== Education ==
Mondejar attended the University of Santo Tomas with a degree in philosophy and obtained a licentiate of philosophy. In 1947, he earned a licentiate in theology in the University of Santo Tomas Central Seminary. He also went to Fordham University in New York in 1959 and earned a master's degree in social services.

== See also ==
- Narciso Villaver Abellana
- Bishop of Romblon

Catholic Church titles
New creation	Bishop of Romblon; 1974 – 1987	Succeeded by Vicente Salgado y Garrucho
