= Banton Church =

Roman Catholic church in Romblon, Philippines

- Saint Nicholas of Tolentino Parish Church
- San Nicolas de Tolentino Parish Church
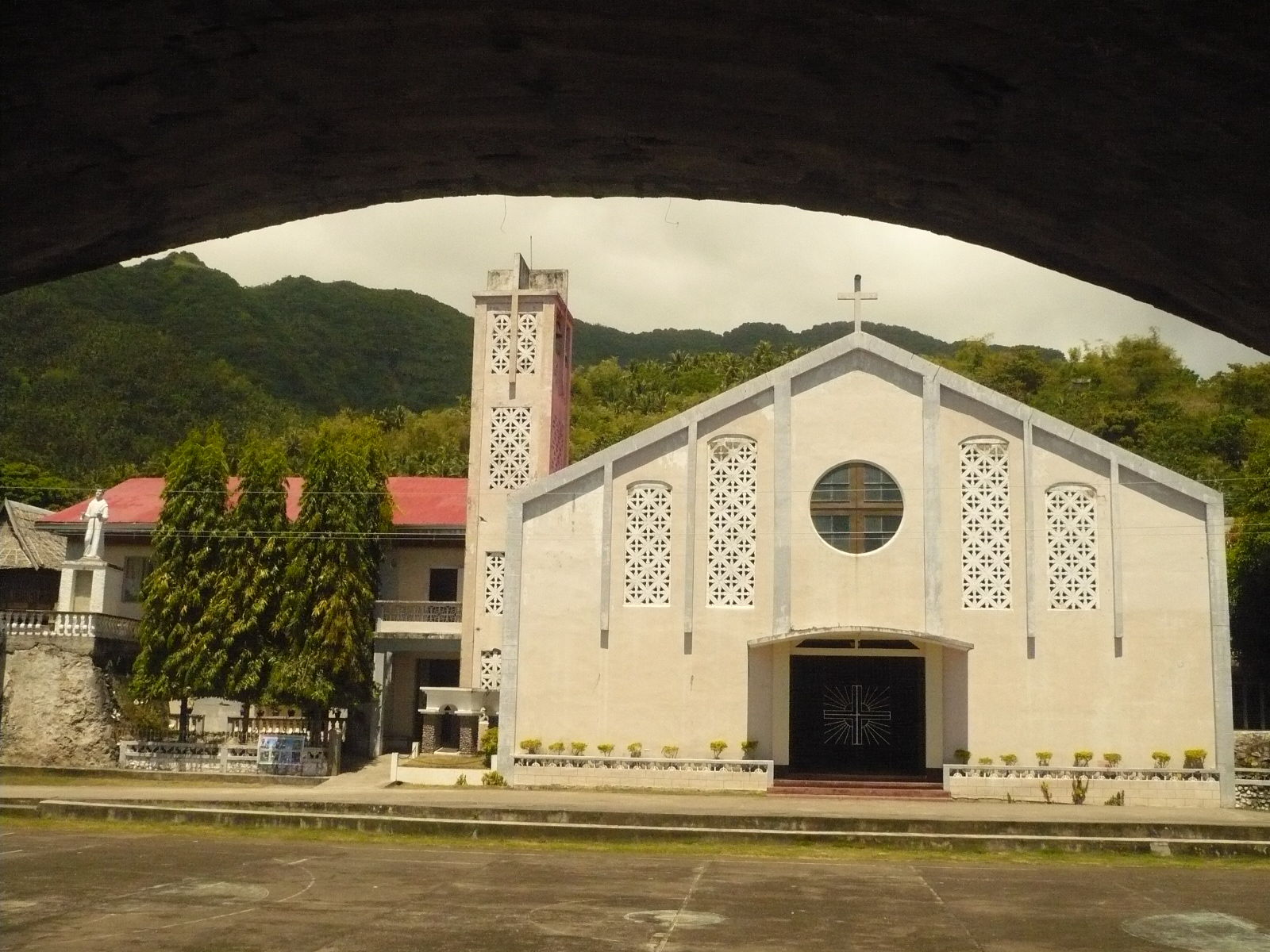
- Church facade in 2012

- Location in Luzon Location in the Philippines
- 12°56′48″N 122°05′43″E
- Location: Poblacion, Banton, Romblon, Philippines
- Country: Philippines
- Denomination: Roman Catholic

History
- Status: Parish Church
- Dedication: Saint Nicholas of Tolentino
- Consecrated: 1635

Architecture
- Functional status: Active
- Architect: Agustin de San Pedro (El Padre Capitan)
- Architectural type: Church building
- Style: Baroque, (Facade:Mid Century Modern)
- Groundbreaking: 1644
- Completed: 1650

Specifications
- Materials: coral/adobe stones

Administration
- District: Diocese of Romblon
- Province: Romblon

Saint Nicholas of Tolentino Parish Church, commonly known as Banton Church, is a Roman Catholic church in the municipality of Banton in Romblon province in the Philippines. It is under the jurisdiction of the Diocese of Romblon. The church is allegedly one of the oldest churches in the country, constructed between 1644 and 1650 during the Spanish colonial period. The façade and tower of the present church is Modern.

== History ==
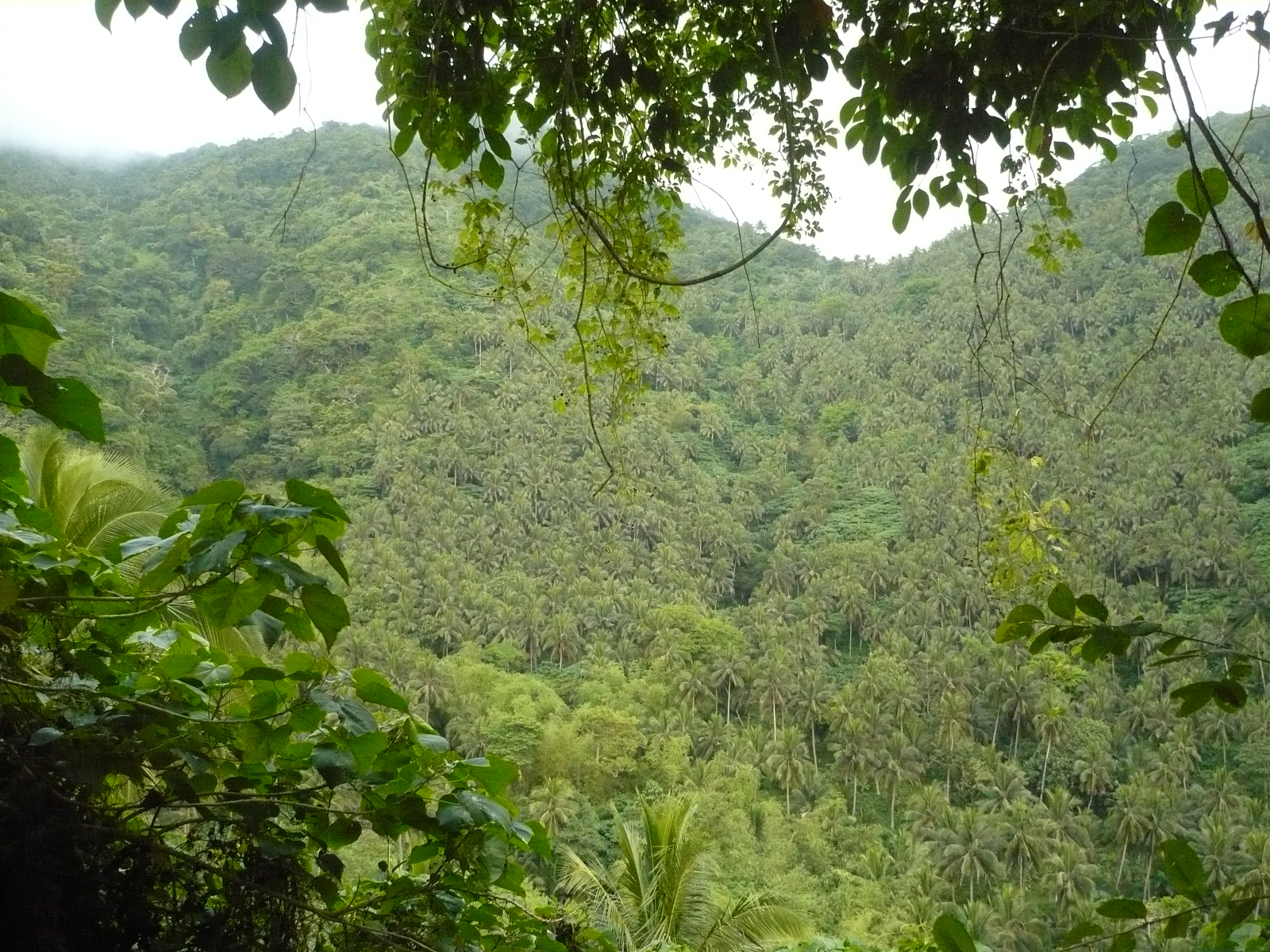
Bacoco, site of the first town

Banton was first mentioned in history when it was written in the chronicle of Maestre de Campo Martin de Goiti in his voyage to Manila on May 12, 1570, on the instruction of Miguel Lopez de Legaspi who then resided in the island of Panay. On October 31, 1571, Banton became an encomienda entrusted to the encomiendero Don Sebastian y Mena, a Spaniard resident in Villa Arevalo in Panay. In 1582, Banton was visited by Miguel de Loarca, who gave a clear view of the island. In his famous book, Relacion de Las Islas Filipinas, it says, "The island is mountainous and almost round in shape planted by coconut trees. There 200 families residing in the island. The majority of them are traders…"

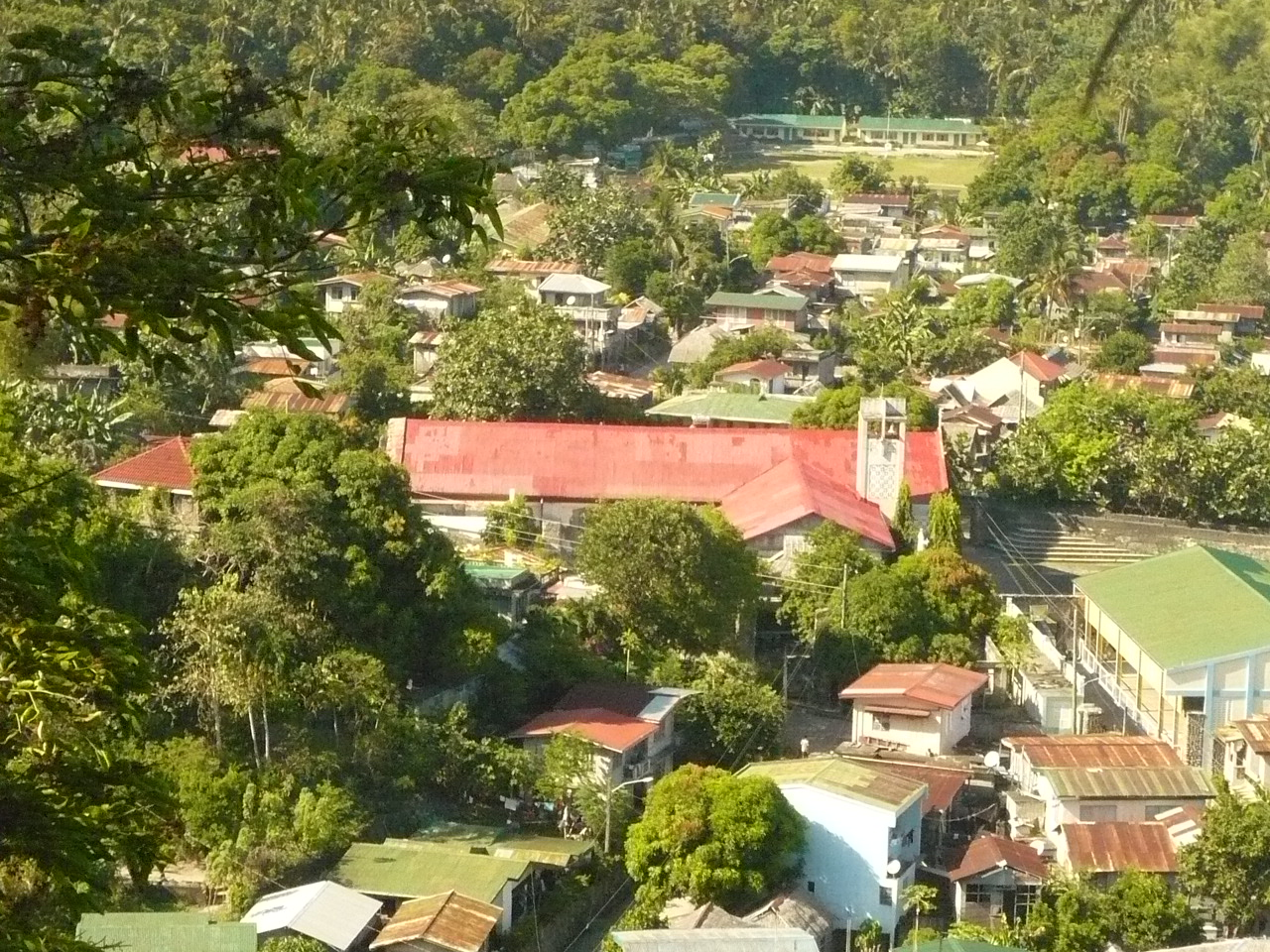
Barangay Poblacion became the permanent settlement of the town. Banton Church situated in the center

Based on the historical accounts of the Augustinian Recollects, Banton was established in 1622 in the hill of Bacoco (now part of Brgy. Hambian), the earliest town established in the Province of Romblon. In 1635, the spiritual administration of the newly established town was entrusted to the Secular Eclessiastics of the Diocese of Cebu as a town annexed to the curacy of Ajui in Panay. Fr. Francisco Rodriguez was assigned as coadjutor priest to Banton and other neighboring islands.

Fr. Francisco Rodriguez encountered obstacles administering the inhabitants of Romblon because of the geography of islands, being far from each other, divided by a rough sea that is a passageway for strong typhoons. Because of the seas that are also exposed to frequent incursions and hostile attacks by the Moro pirates, the priest wrote a letter and asked the Prior Provincial Padre Don Jose dela Anunciacion to send a fighting priest to replace him. The request of Padre Rodriguez was granted by the decree of the Bishop of Cebu Don Padre de Arce on July 27, 1635, entrusting the evangelization of Romblon Archipelago to the care of the Order of Augustinian Recollects (OAR). Fr. Pedro de San Jose was the first Recollect missionary to step in the soil of Romblon. In the same year, 1635, the OAR extended their missionary work to Banton. The missionaries relocated the town from the hill of Bacoco to its present location (Poblacion). The Recollects said, "Although it's more spacious that its former location, it is still not large enough to accommodate all the number of houses and edifices required by its inhabitants…"

=== A fortress church ===
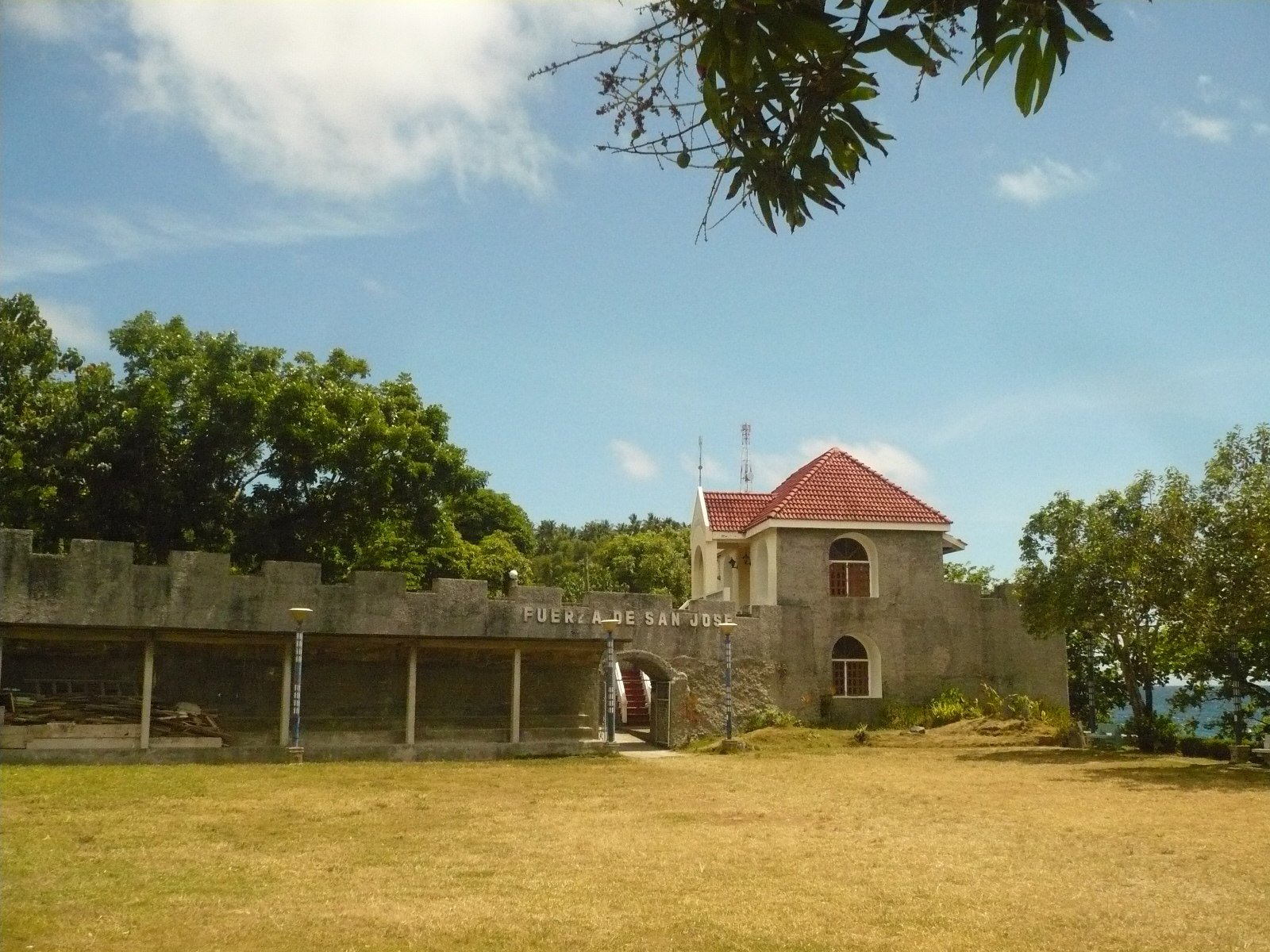
Fuerza de San José

According to the historical records of the Recollects, almost immediately after taking on the post of the missionaries, violent attacks were launched in Romblon by the Moros. The savage attacks of the Muslims gravely disrupted the evangelization of the first Recollect mission, Fr. Pedro de San Jose even reaching to the point of driving him to escape in mountains. When Fr. Juan de San Antonio, superior of the Recollects informed about the situation, he was determined and acted decisively to fortify the towns of Romblon and Banton (a task which would be very difficult for the missionary to undertake). The superior assigned Fr. Agustin de San Pedro to the islands to protect the lives of its Christian inhabitants. Fr. Agustin won fame for his heroic actions against the pirates and war exploits in Mindanao, which earned him a title of El Padre Capitan, a famous name in Philippine history. The newly appointed priest immediately began the construction of the churches and forts of the town of Romblon and the church fortress of Banton between the years 1640 and 1650.

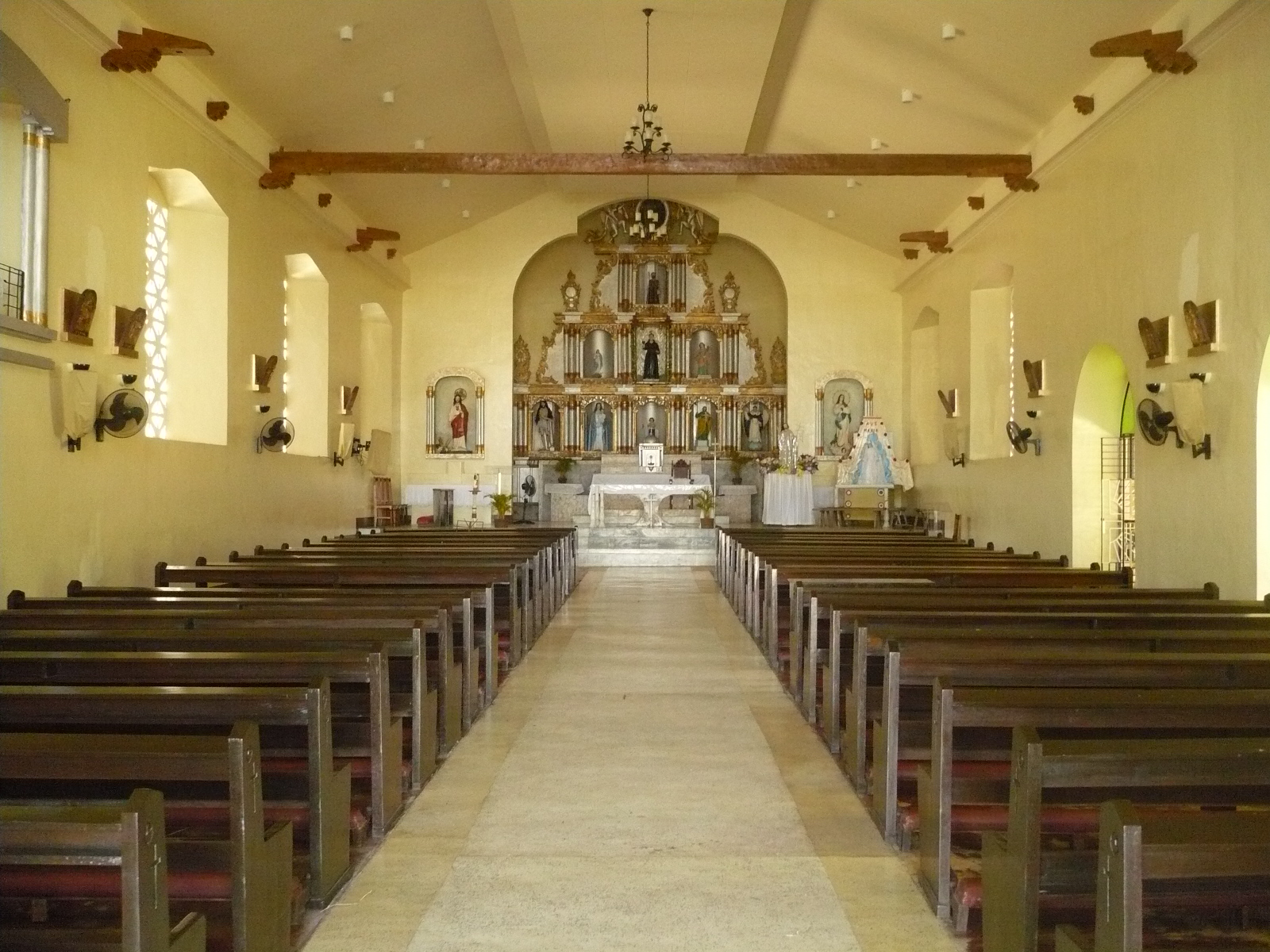
Banton Church interior in 2012

In Banton, El Padre Capitan constructed first the church and convent then the walls that encircle the complex. In every corner of the walls, he put towers for watching approaching enemies. A deep well and other important facilities were constructed for the needs of the evacuees in case there is a threat of Muslim attacks. To the north of the church, he built a watchtower on the top of Onti Hill that has a commanding view of the entire Sibuyan Sea and the exit points of the vessels from the Port of Romblon as well as the ships going toward the south of the archipelago.

Banton Church was dedicated to the patron saint of the parish, Saint Nicholas of Tolentino. The fort was named "Fuerza de San José" (Fort San Jose) in honor of Saint Joseph. In 1870, the details and the condition of the fortress church were mentioned in Memoria de Panay: "The fort is in the form of an isosceles triangle. The walls measure 111.17 metres long, 2.08 metres thick and 4.58 metres high. On the top of the walls are 12 cannons with different calibers…"

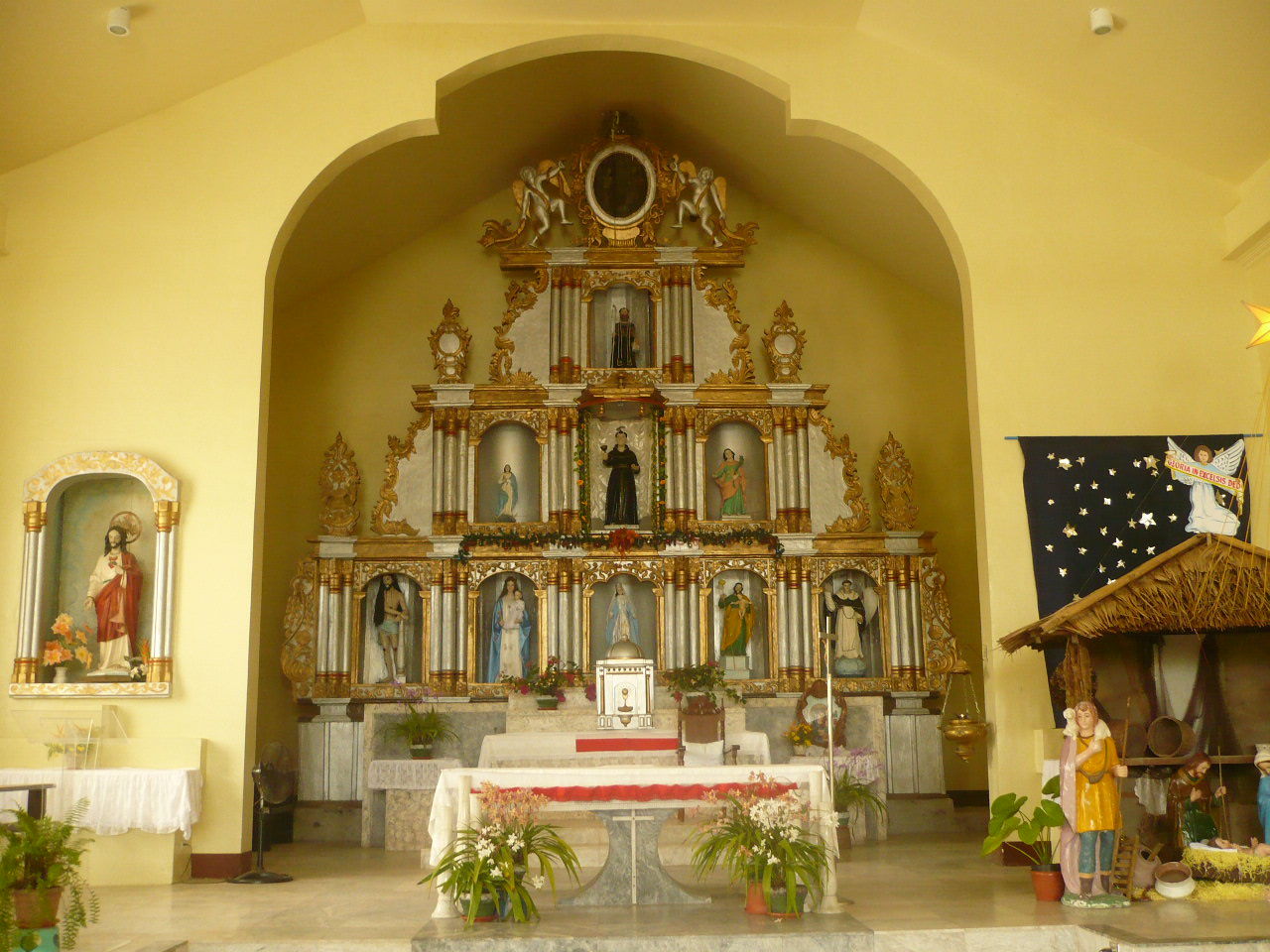
Banton Church retablo mayor

In the field of material achievements, much had been done by the Recollects and the Bantoanons. They reconstructed the church continually due to devastating typhoons that may come and the surprise attacks of Muslims. Because of these, they paid less attention to the artistic designs of the church concentrating more on building them strong enough to hold on against whatever destructive elements to come.

In the book Sinopsis Historica, it says, "The accomplishment of El Padre Capitan is truly amazing. At one time, a fleet sailed from Jolo to attack the island of Banton, on its way; the Moros were trying to avoid passing Banton and Romblon in order to avoid a confrontation with the fighting priest. The enemy arrived on the sea craft and under the direction of El Padre Capitan, set on fire eight barges (caracoas) and with the rest of the vessels, successfully destroyed the enemy. This served as warning against future attacks. Since then, Muslim piracy in the island was eradicated." "Due to its location and because of the work of El Padre Capitan, the fortress church of Banton is a real bastion and it would be difficult to find another fort in the archipelago into which so much effort has been poured, for the purpose of depending its inhabitants. The inhabitants themselves are simple folk, actively devoted to the town of their birth and on all occasions, whether in defense against the Moros or thieves, they have always exhibited bravery."

== Gallery ==
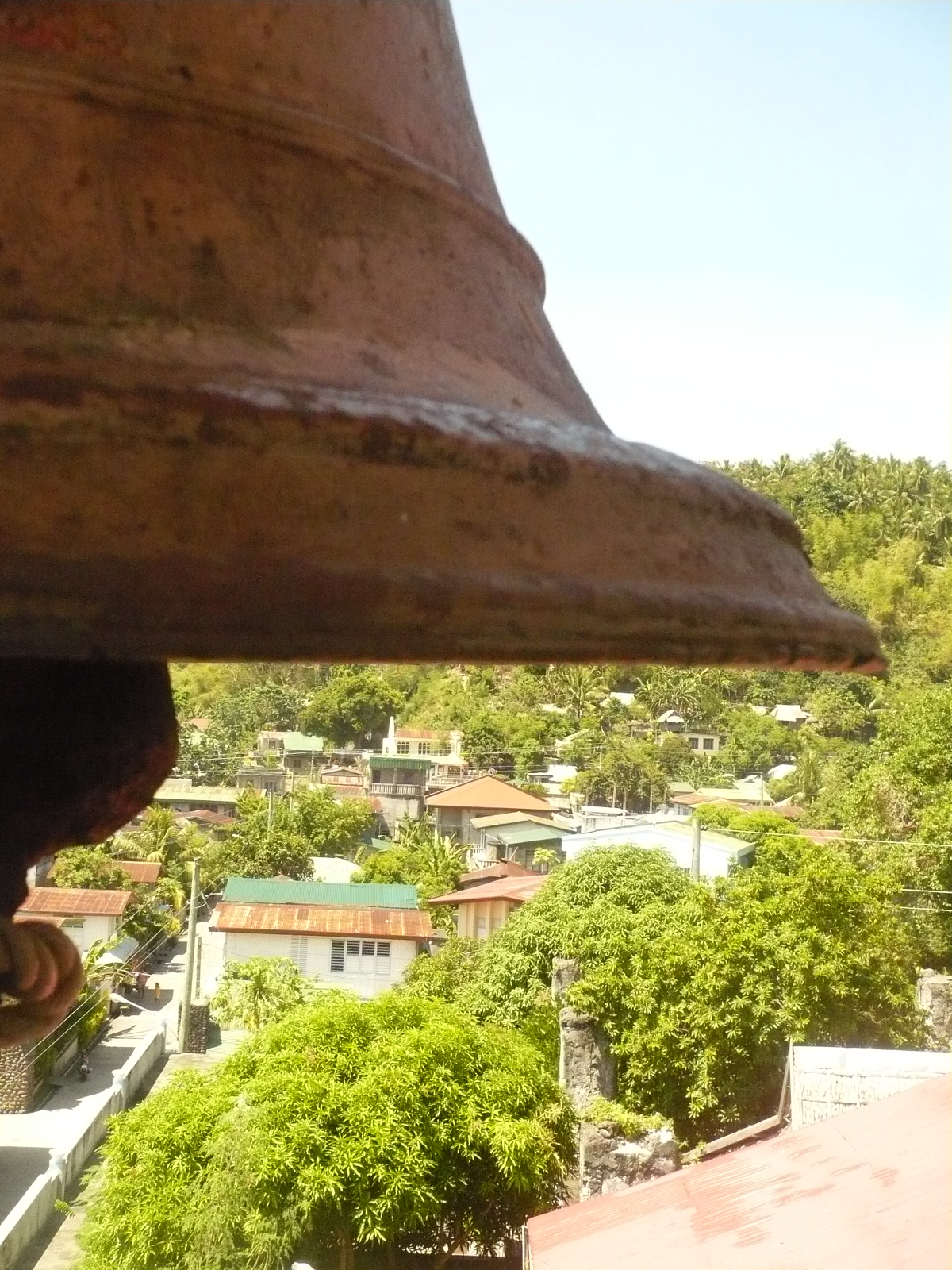
Banton Church old bell

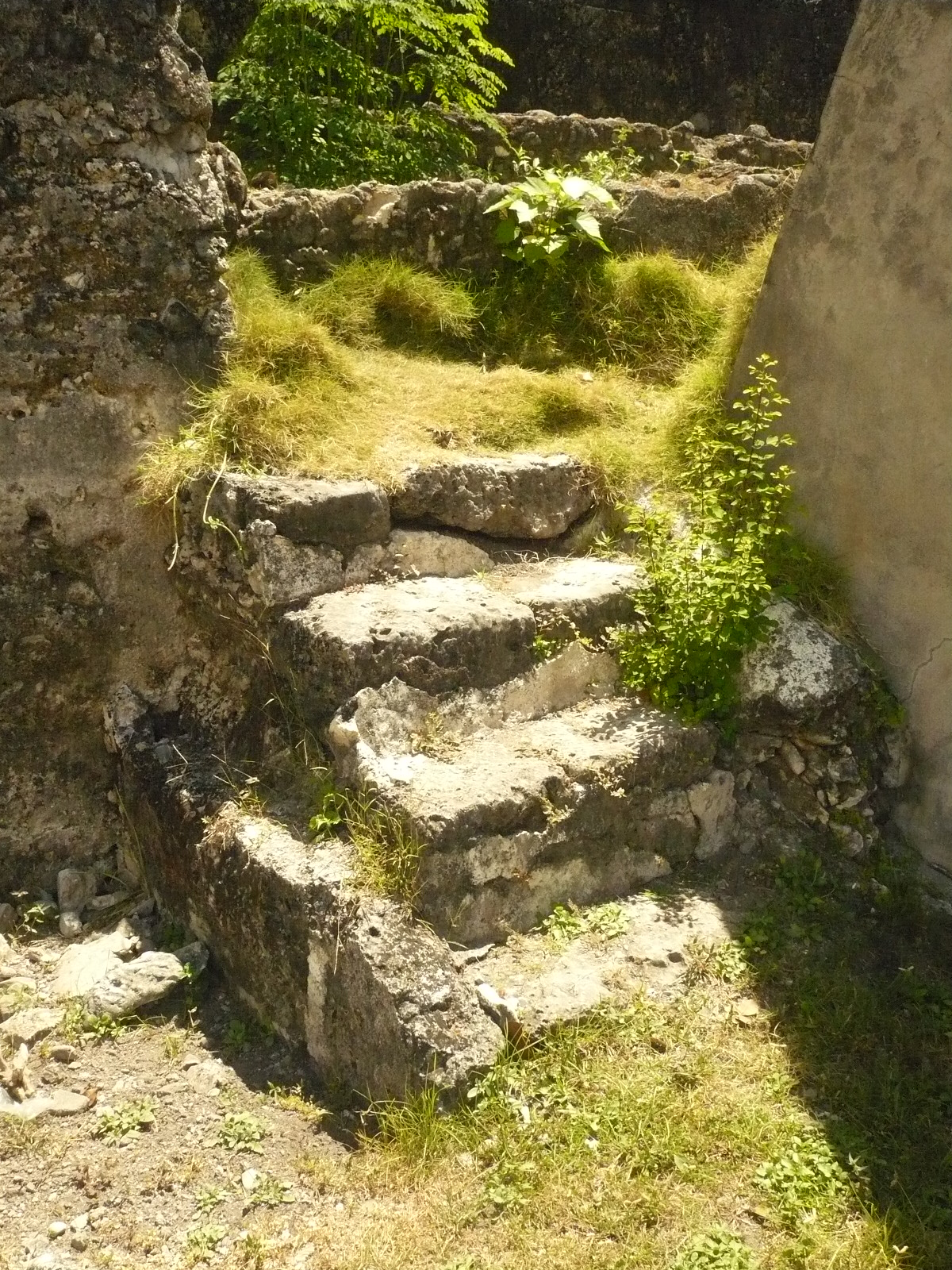
Coral stone steps leading to the fort

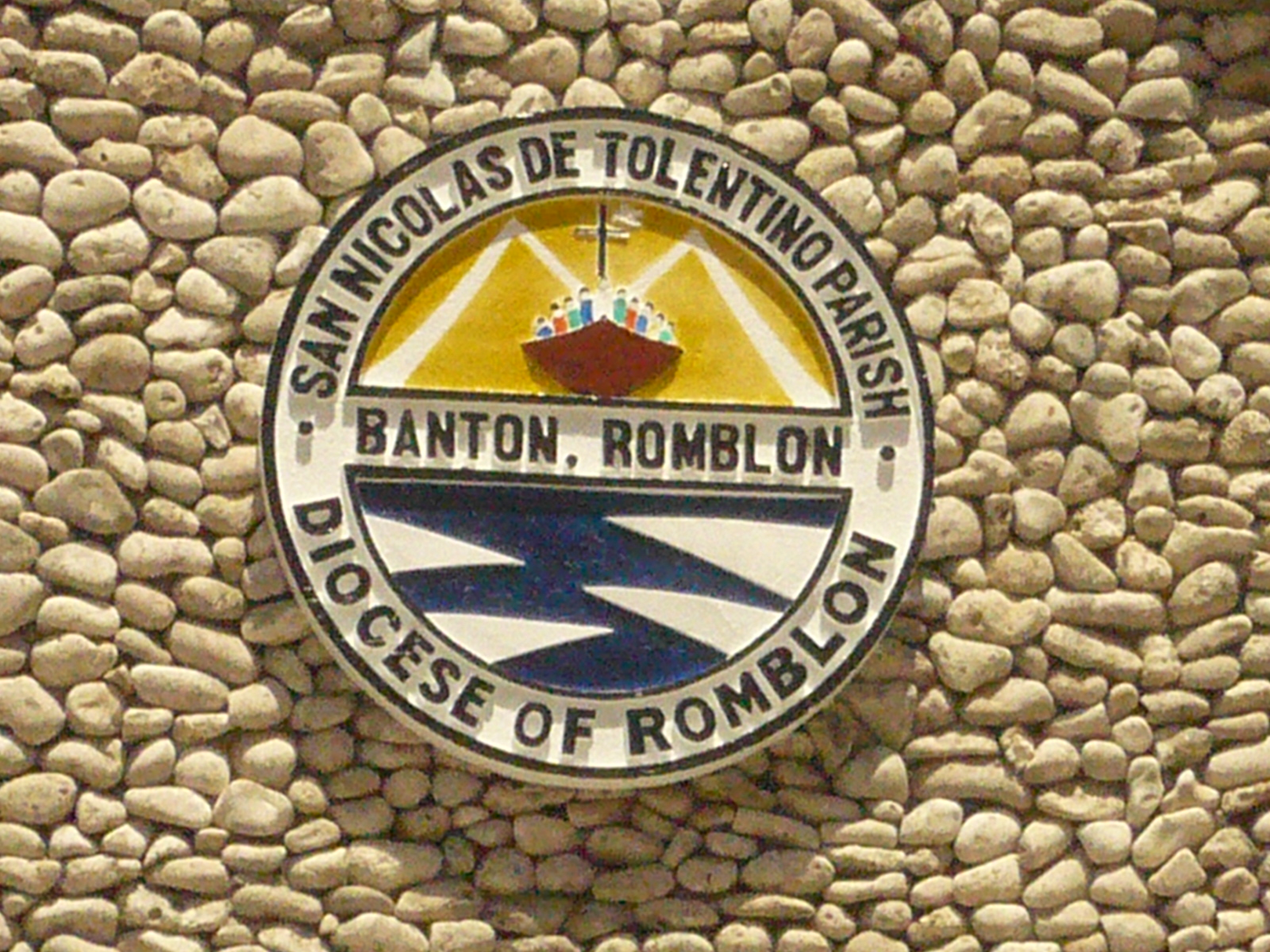
San Nicolas de Tolentino Parish logo

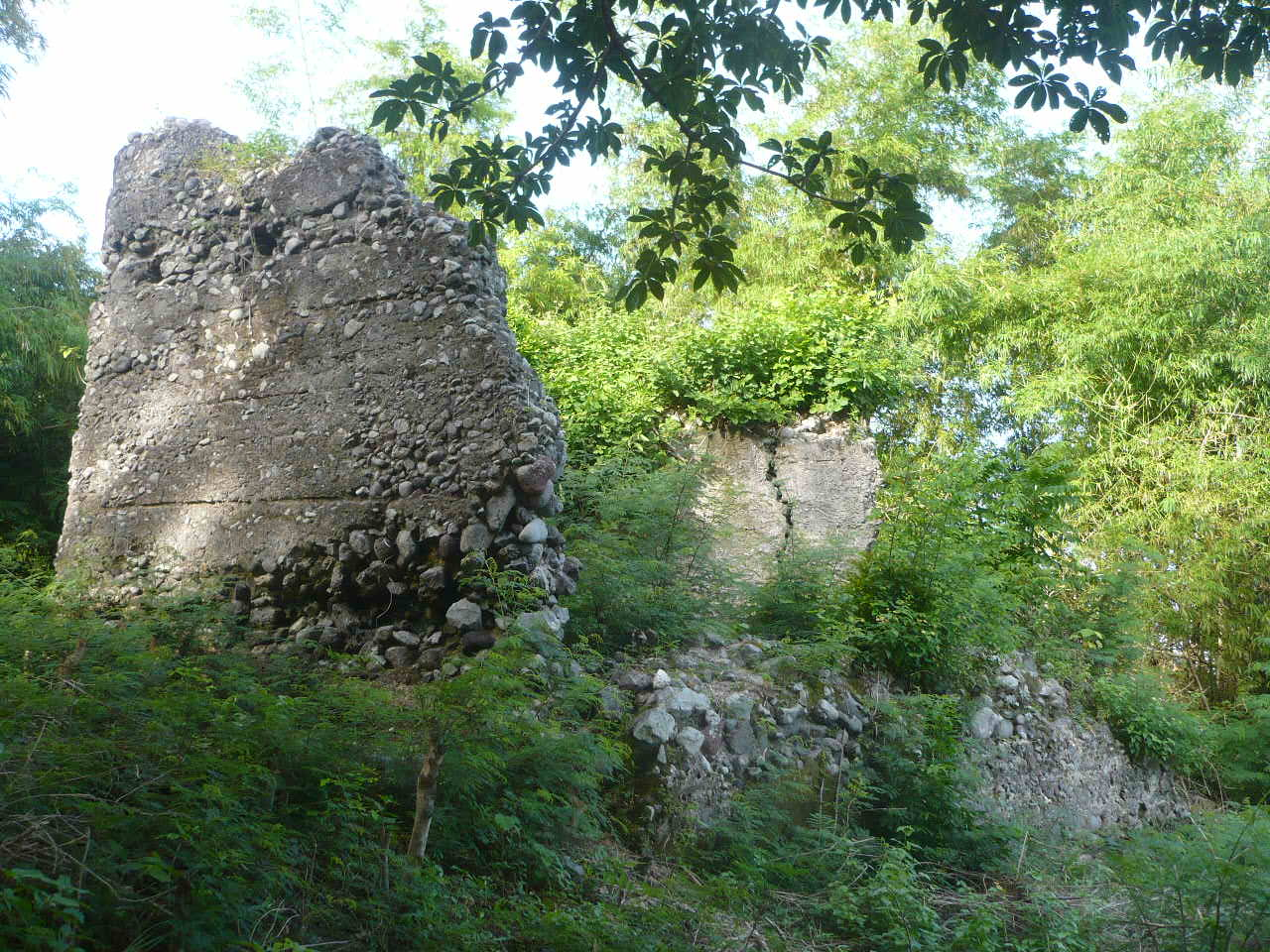
Ruins of the Onti Watchtower

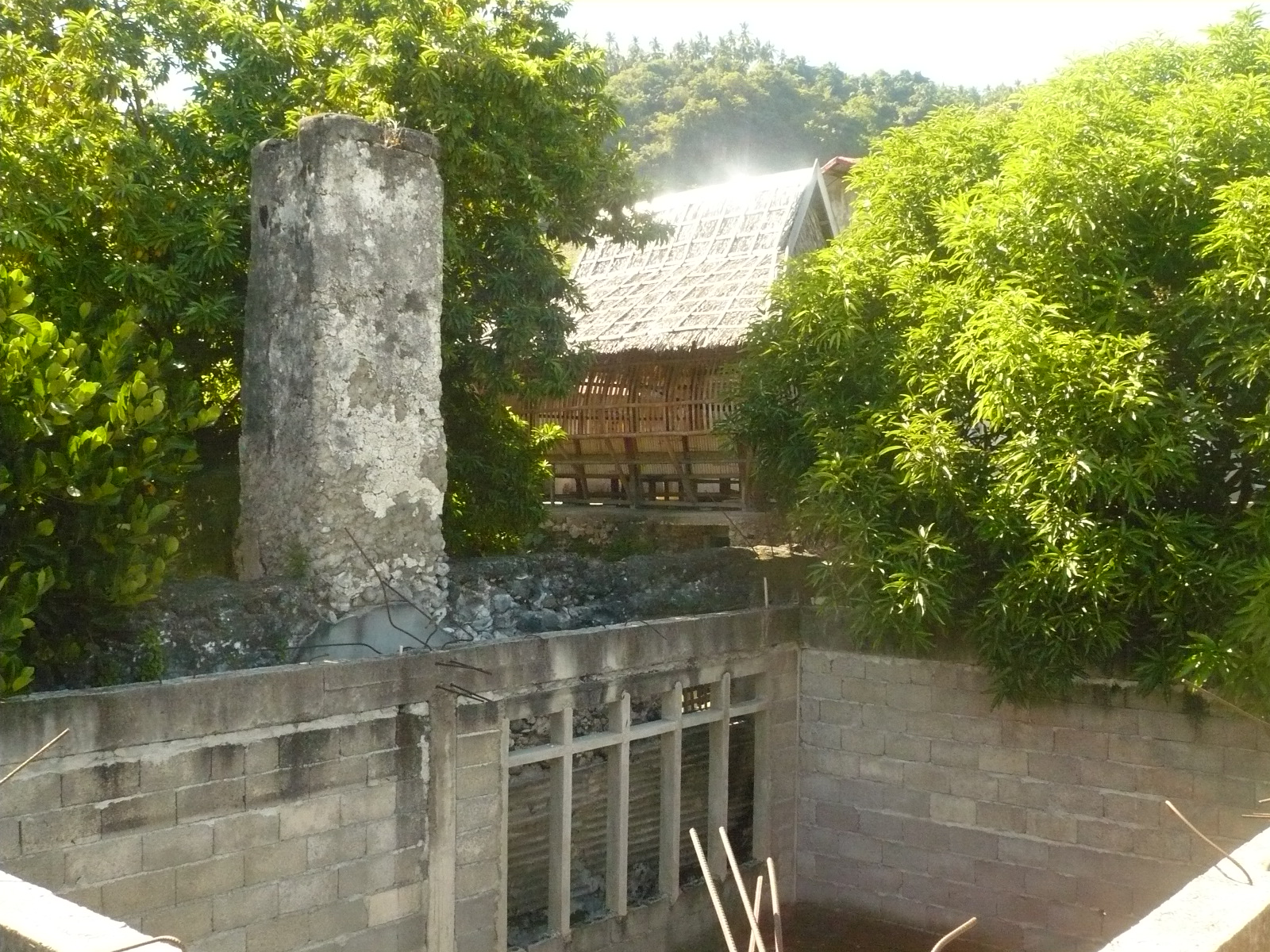
Ruins of the old convent

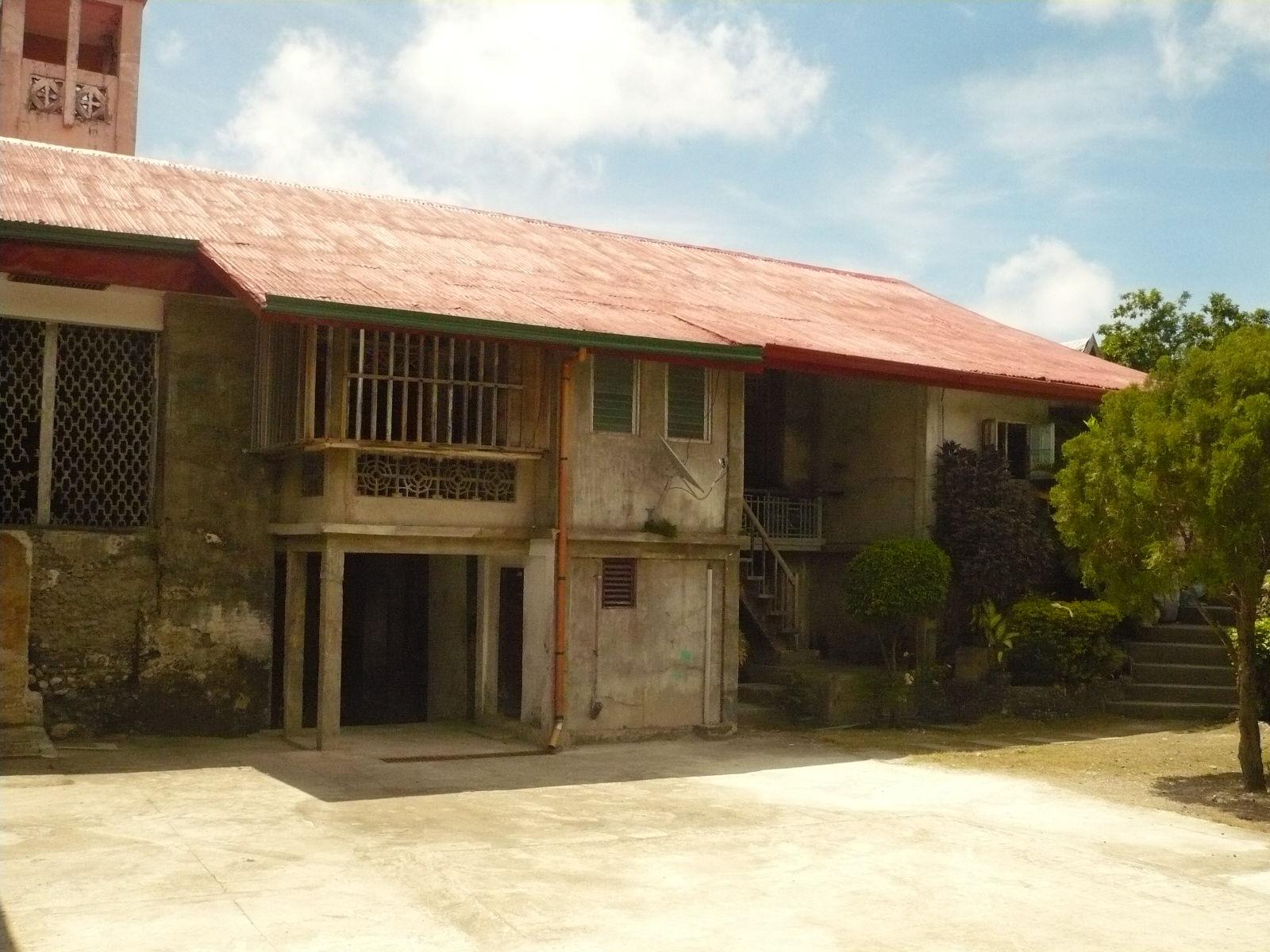
Banton Church convent

== See also ==
- Banton, Romblon
- Banton Island
