= Jose Alan Dialogo =

Filipino bishop of the Catholic Church (born 1960)

His Excellency, The Most Reverend Jose Alan V. Dialogo D.D.
- Bishop of Sorsogon
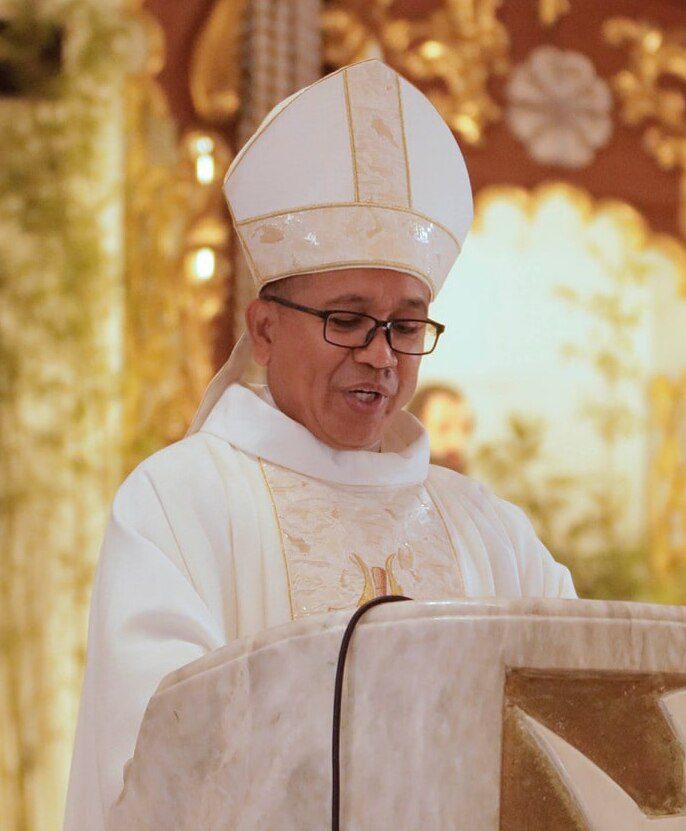
- Dialogo in 2020
- Province: Caceres
- See: Sorsogon
- Appointed: October 15, 2019
- Installed: December 14, 2019
- Predecessor: Arturo Bastes

Orders
- Ordination: July 31, 1996
- Consecration: December 12, 2019 by Luis Antonio Tagle

Personal details
- Born: July 10, 1962 (age 64) Lagonoy, Camarines Sur, Philippines
- Education: University of Nueva Caceres, Pontifical Gregorian University
- Motto: Fiat (Let it be so)
- Coat of arms

Styles of Jose Alan V. Dialogo
- Reference style: His Excellency; The Most Reverend
- Spoken style: Your Excellency
- Religious style: Bishop

Jose Alan Verdejo Dialogo (born July 10, 1962) is a Filipino bishop of the Roman Catholic Church who currently serves as the Bishop of the Diocese of Sorsogon in the Philippines. He was appointed to this position by Pope Francis on October 15, 2019, and was consecrated on December 12, 2019. He officially assumed office on December 14, 2019.

== Early life and education ==
Dialogo was born in Lagonoy, Camarines Sur, Philippines, on July 10, 1962. He obtained a bachelor's degree in psychology from the University of Nueva Caceres. He later pursued studies in philosophy and theology at the Holy Apostles Senior Seminary in Makati City. In 1999, he earned a licentiate in spirituality from the Pontifical Gregorian University in Rome.

== Priesthood ==
He was ordained a priest for the Archdiocese of Manila on July 31, 1996. Following his ordination, he served in various pastoral roles. Between 1996 and 1997, he was assigned as Parish Vicar at San Roque Parish in Mandaluyong. From 1999 to 2002, he served as Vice-Rector and Dean of Seminarians at the Holy Apostles Senior Seminary in Guadalupe, Makati City, and later became its Rector from 2003 to 2008. From 2008 to 2015, he was the Parish Priest of St. John of the Cross Parish in Pembo, Makati City. Beginning in 2015, he served as Director of the Cardinal Sin Welcome Home, a facility for retired priests in Manila.

== Episcopal Ministry ==
On October 15, 2019, Pope Francis appointed Dialogo as the Bishop of Sorsogon, succeeding Bishop Arturo Bastes, who had reached the mandatory retirement age. His episcopal ordination took place on December 12, 2019, at the Manila Cathedral, with Cardinal Luis Antonio Tagle serving as the principal consecrator. He officially assumed leadership of the Diocese of Sorsogon on December 14, 2019, during a ceremony led by Archbishop Rolando Tria Tirona at the Cathedral of Saints Peter and Paul in Sorsogon City.

Within the Catholic Bishops' Conference of the Philippines, he was the regional representative of South Luzon to the Permanent Council from 2023 to 2025.

Catholic Church titles
Preceded by Arturo Bastes	Bishop of Sorsogon; December 14, 2019 – present	Incumbent
