= Diocese of Sorsogon =

Latin Catholic diocese in the Philippines

Diocese of Sorsogon Dioecesis Sorsogonensis Diyosesis kan Sorsogon Diyosesis san Sorsogon Diyosesis ng Sorsogon

Catholic
- Sorsogon Cathedral

- Coat of arms

Location
- Country: Philippines
- Territory: Sorsogon
- Ecclesiastical province: Caceres
- Metropolitan: Caceres
- Coordinates: 12°58′07″N 124°00′18″E

Statistics
- Area: 2,141.45 km^{2} (826.82 sq mi)
- Population: Total; Catholics: (as of 2021); 828,655; 770,649 (93.0%)

Information
- Denomination: Catholic Church
- Sui iuris church: Latin Church
- Rite: Roman Rite
- Established: June 29, 1951
- Cathedral: Cathedral of Sts. Peter and Paul
- Patron saints: Peter and Paul

Current leadership
- Pope: Leo XIV
- Bishop: Jose Alan Verdejo Dialogo
- Metropolitan Archbishop: Rex Andrew Clement Alarcon
- Vicar General: Roger Joseph B. Erestain Jr.

Map
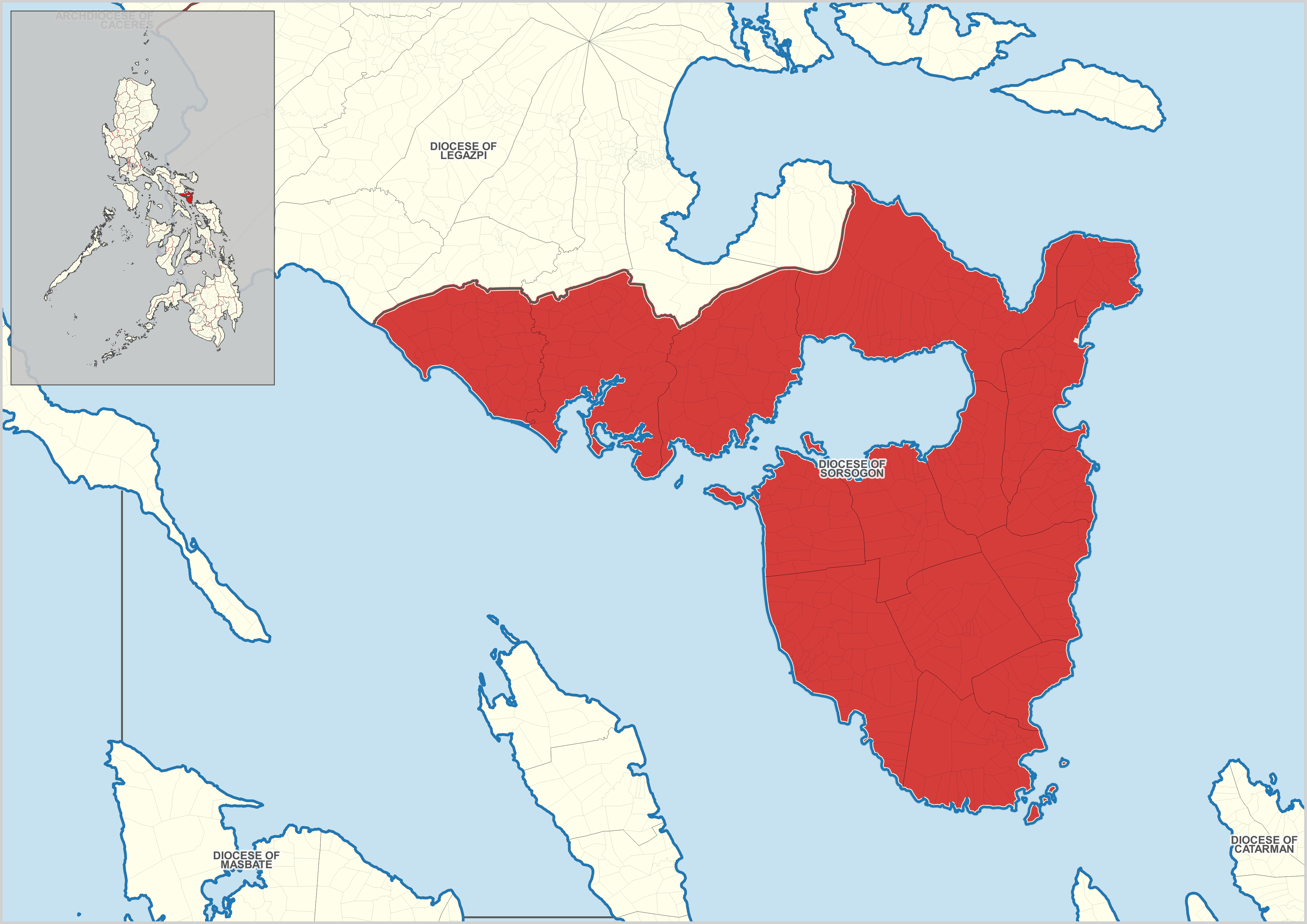
- Territorial jurisdiction of the Diocese of Sorsogon

The Diocese of Sorsogon (Latin: Dioecesis Sorsogonensis) is a diocese of the Latin Church of the Catholic Church in the Philippines. The diocese was established in 1951 by the Archdiocese of Caceres, and in 1968, the diocese was subdivided after the Diocese of Masbate separated. The diocese is a suffragan of the Archdiocese of Caceres.

== Coat of arms ==
The volcano of Bulusan is surmounted by the keys and the sword that represent Saints Peter and Paul respectively who are titulars of the cathedral. The book with the lily surrounded by fishes represent Saint Anthony of Padua, Doctor of the Church and patron saint of the capital of Masbate which is within the territory of the diocese (until 1968). The fishes allude to one of the miracles attributed to the saint while still alive: when men did not listen to his preaching, he went to preach to the fishes, which lifted up their heads above the water in rapt attention.

== Bishops ==
=== Ordinaries ===
No	Name	In office	Coat of arms
1.	Teopisto V. Alberto †	July 10, 1952 – September 7, 1959	
2.	Arnulfo S. Arcilla †	September 7, 1959 appointed – December 11, 1979	
3.	Jesus Y. Varela †	November 27, 1980 – April 16, 2003	
4.	Arturo M. Bastes SVD †	April 16, 2003 – 14 October 2019	
5.	Jose Alan V. Dialogo	15 October 2019 – present	

=== Coadjutor bishop ===
- Arturo Mandin Bastes, S.V.D. † (2002–2003)

=== Auxiliary bishop ===
- Concordio Maria Sarte † (1977–1980), appointed bishop of Legazpi

=== Other priests of this diocese who became bishops ===
- Manuel Platon Del Rosario †, appointed coadjutor bishop of Calbayog in 1955
- José Tomás Sánchez †, appointed auxiliary bishop of Caceres in 1968

== Sources ==
- Catholic Church in the Philippines
- Official website of the Roman Catholic Diocese of Sorsogon
- The Official Facebook Page of the Roman Catholic Diocese of Sorsogon
