= Sorsogon Cathedral =

Roman Catholic church in Sorsogon, Philippines

- Saints Peter and Paul Parish Cathedral; Parokyang Katedral nina San Pedro at San Pablo (Filipino); Parroquia Catedral de San Pedro y San Pablo (Spanish)
- Sorsogon Cathedral in 2023

- Location in Sorsogon Location in Luzon Location in the Philippines
- 12°58′07″N 124°00′18″E
- Location: Sorsogon City, Sorsogon
- Country: Philippines
- Denomination: Roman Catholic

History
- Status: Cathedral
- Founded: 1628
- Dedication: Saints Peter and Paul
- Consecrated: 1628, 1792, 1951, 2011

Architecture
- Functional status: Active
- Architectural type: Church building
- Style: Eclectic
- Groundbreaking: 1954, 2007
- Demolished: 1954

Administration
- Archdiocese: Caceres
- Diocese: Sorsogon

Clergy
- Bishop: Jose Alan Verdejo Dialogo
- Rector: Very Rev. Rowan E. Gramonte
- Priests: Rev. Fr. Rashid Lander D. Golimlim; Rev. Fr. Dean Simon F. Peña

Sorsogon Cathedral (Filipino: Katedral ng Sorsogon), officially known by its ecclesiastical name, the Saints Peter and Paul Parish Cathedral (Filipino: Parokyang Katedral nina San Pedro at San Pablo), is a Roman Catholic cathedral in Sorsogon City, capital of Sorsogon province, Philippines. The cathedral faces the Sorsogon Bay and is situated in the city center of Sorsogon City. It is the seat of the Roman Catholic Diocese of Sorsogon with Saints Peter and Paul as primary patron saints.

== History ==
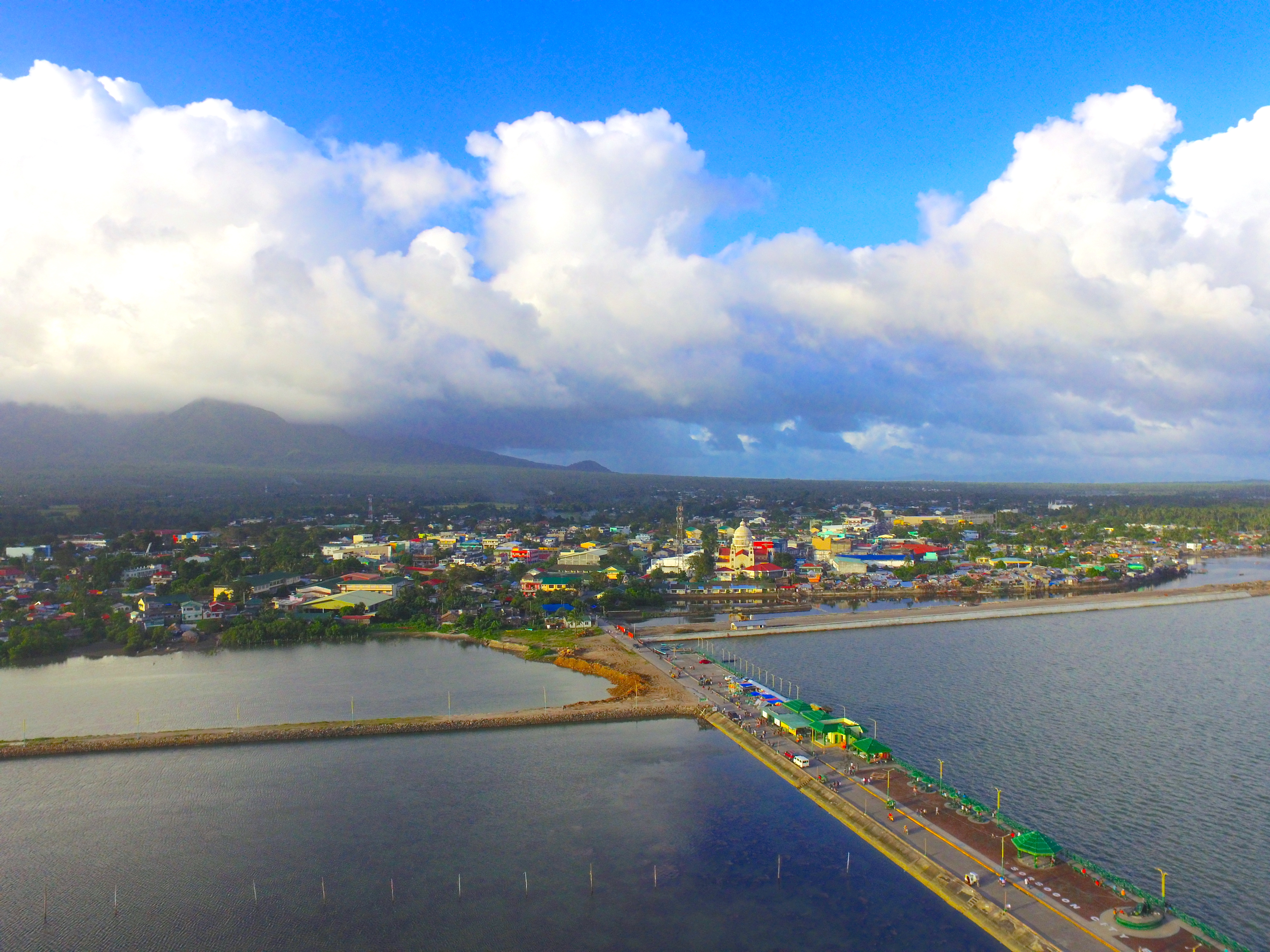
Downtown Sorsogon City and Sorsogon Bay showing the cathedral as the domed-building off-center

The spread of Catholicism in the province of Sorsogon begun in 1583 by the Franciscans. In the year 1600 they established the first parish in Casiguran and Bacon and Bulusan we're its first visita.

The parish mission of Bacon, now a Sorsogon district in the city's northern coast, was established in 1617 with Sorsogon and Dumanaog as its visitas. In 1628, Sorsogon, the present area in the city's southern coast, was made an independent parish under the patronage of Saint Anthony of Padua. Fray Francisco San Diego was the first parish priest of Sorsogon which at the time had a church made of nipa and bamboo. Sorsogon then took Dumanaog as a visita which eventually became a parish of its own in 1641.

In 1660, the first stone church of Sorsogon was inaugurated. Sorsogon was one of the settlements along the coast of Sorsogon Bay which fell into Moro raids in Bicol region in August 1754. Secular priests from the Diocese of Nueva Caceres took over the parish administration of Sorsogon in 1680 before the term of Bishop Andres Gonzales. The Franciscan Recollects returned to manage the parish in 1768 with Fr. Ginez Antonio Fernandez as its parish priest. In 1792, the titular of the parish became Saints Peter and Paul, replacing Saint Anthony of Padua. After 26 years, in 1794, the Recollects ceded the administration of the parish to the native clergy.

An earthquake on March 21, 1840, levelled the church which left 165 deaths, 15 of which were buried alive in the ruins. The said earthquake ravaged the town of Sorsogon which had tremors that lasted for 35 days. In 1864, Sorsogon was made an independent municipality under Albay province. Thirty years later, in 1894, the province of Sorsogon was excised from Albay and was named after Sorsogon, the designated capital town.

Fr. Jorge Barlin served as the parish priest and vicar forane of Sorsogon from 1887 until 1903 when he was appointed as bishop of Nueva Caceres, and as the first Filipino bishop of the Catholic Church.

The church of Sorsogon was declared as the cathedral of the Roman Catholic Diocese of Sorsogon when it was canonically founded on June 29, 1951, feast of Saints Peter and Paul. Teopisto Alberto was the diocese's first bishop.

The magnitude 6.6 earthquake of July 2, 1954 destroyed the bell tower of the cathedral. The said damage prompted Bishop Alberto in the same year to reconstruct the cathedral in neo-Gothic architectural style. Under Bishop Arnulfo Arcilla, the cathedral's transept was constructed in 1972.

Typhoons Milenyo and Reming in 2006 damaged the church which again prompted the then Bishop Arturo Bastes to reconstruct the cathedral in its current style. The finished cathedral was inaugurated in 2011 on the occasion of 60th anniversary of the Diocese of Sorsogon.
