= Narciso Abellana =

Filipino Roman Catholic bishop

His Excellency, The Most Reverend Narciso V. Abellana MSC, D.D.
- Bishop of Romblon
- Church: Roman Catholic
- Province: Capiz
- Diocese: Romblon
- See: Romblon
- Appointed: 15 October 2013
- Installed: 9 January 2014
- Predecessor: Jose Corazon Tala-oc
- Successor: Incumbent
- Previous posts: 1st assistant to the Superior General, Missionaries of the Sacred Heart

Orders
- Ordination: 28 December 1978
- Consecration: 11 December 2013 by Socrates Villegas

Personal details
- Born: Narciso Abellana; 11 November 1953 (age 72) Talisay, Cebu, Philippines
- Denomination: Roman Catholicism
- Profession: Missionaries of the Sacred Heart
- Motto: In Verbo tuo laxabo rete (Latin for 'At Your Word, I will let down the nets.' – Luke 5:5
- Coat of arms

Styles of Narciso Villaver Abellana
- Reference style: The Most Reverend
- Spoken style: Your Excellency
- Religious style: Bishop

Narciso Abellana y Villaver M.S.C. (born 11 November 1953) is a Filipino Roman Catholic bishop and the current and fifth Bishop of Romblon. Ordained to the priesthood on 28 December 1978, Villaver Abellana was named bishop of the Roman Catholic Diocese of Romblon, Philippines on 15 October 2013.

== Life ==
Abellana was born in the city of Talisay, Cebu. He was ordained priest on 28 December 1978. He was appointed Bishop of Romblon on 15 October 2013. His episcopal ordination on 11 December 2013 was almost two months late after his appointment.

He was installed Bishop of Romblon on 9 January 2014.

== See also ==
- Roman Catholic Diocese of Romblon
- Bishop of Romblon
- Nicolas M. Mondejar
- Vicente Salgado y Garrucho

Catholic Church titles
Preceded by Jose Corazon Tumbagahan Tala-oc	Bishop of Romblon; 2015 – present	Incumbent
