= Diocese of Romblon =

Latin Catholic diocese in the Philippines

Diocese of Romblon Dioecesis Rombloniensis: Diyosesis ng Romblon; Diocesis de Romblon

Catholic
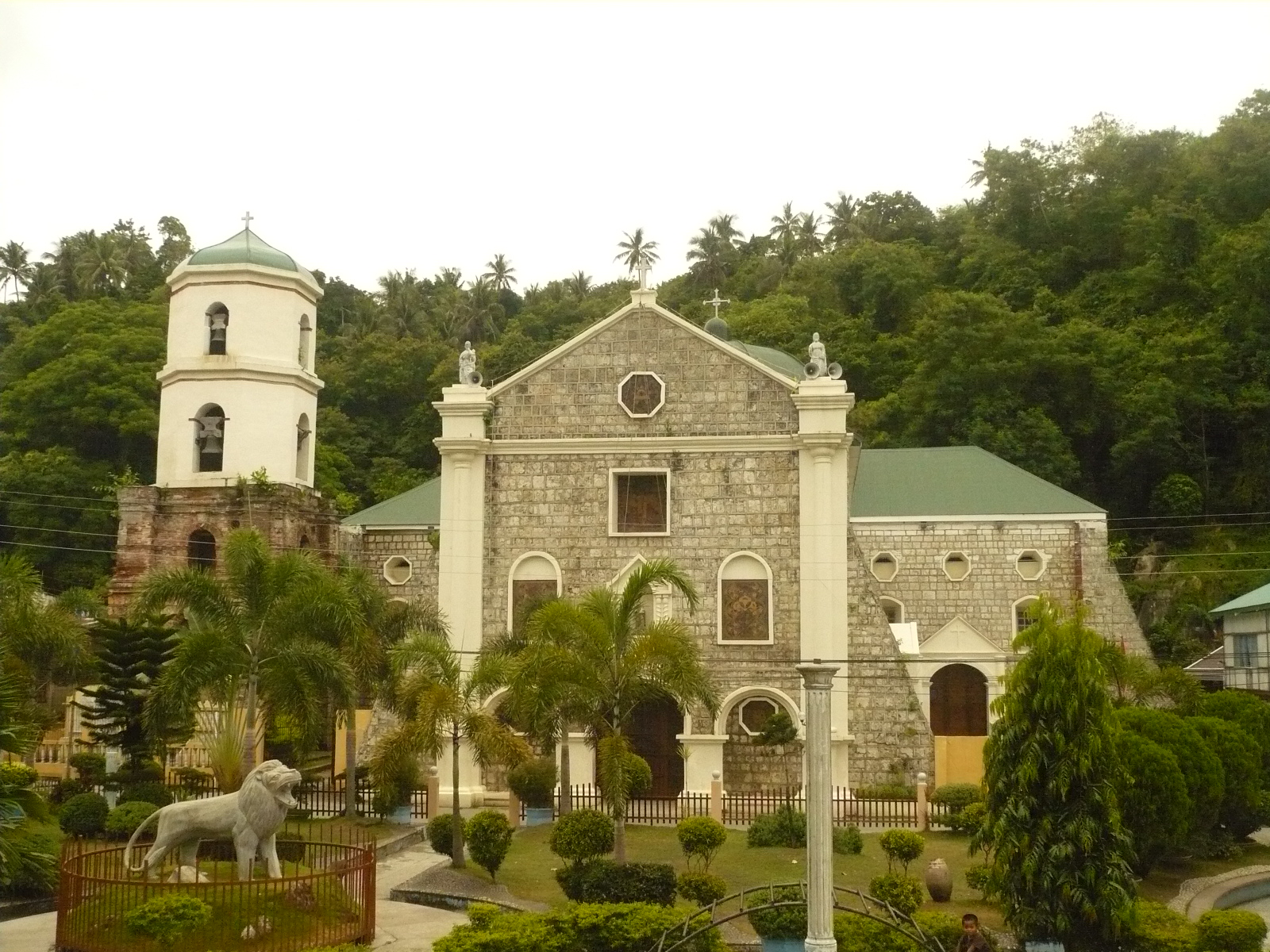
- Romblon Cathedral

- Coat of arms

Location
- Country: Philippines
- Territory: Romblon
- Ecclesiastical province: Capiz
- Metropolitan: Capiz
- Coordinates: 12°34′33″N 122°16′10″E

Statistics
- Area: 1,567 km^{2} (605 sq mi)
- Population: Total; Catholics: (as of 2021); 574,170; 467,520 (81.4%)

Information
- Denomination: Catholic
- Sui iuris church: Latin Church
- Rite: Roman Rite
- Established: 19 December 1974
- Cathedral: Cathedral of St. Joseph in Romblon

Current leadership
- Pope: Leo XIV
- Bishop: Narciso Villaver Abellana
- Metropolitan Archbishop: Victor Barnuevo Bendico
- Vicar General: Nonato Ernie Fetalino

Website
- Official website

The Diocese of Romblon (Latin: Dioecesis Rombloniesis) is a Latin Catholic diocese of the Catholic Church in the Philippines. A constituent of the sui iuris Latin Church, it is a suffragan of the Archdiocese of Capiz. Its titular patron is St. Joseph, spouse of the Blessed Virgin Mary, and its secondary patron is the Santo Niño. Erected in 1974, the diocese has experienced no jurisdictional changes in that time.

The diocese is divided into six vicariates and has twenty-four parishes, ministered by thirty priests and one religious brother of the Society of the Divine Word (SVD). It covers a land area of 1,355 square kilometers (523 sq mi) and has a population of 227,621 of which 87 per cent are Catholics.

== Ecclesiastical District of Romblon & Maghali Islands ==
I. Vicariate of St. Joseph, Patron of the Universal Church
Order	Church	Municipality	Established
1	St. Joseph Cathedral	Romblon	1635
2	Our Lady of Fatima Parish	Romblon	1990
3	Parish of St. Anthony de Padua	Romblon	1984
4	Bliss Fisherfolk Christian Community Chaplaincy	Romblon	1975

II. Vicariate of St. Joseph the Worker
Order	Church	Municipality	Established
1	Parish of St. Joseph, the Worker	Corcuera	1985
2	Parish of St. Nicolas of Tolentino	Banton	1644
3	Parish of Our Lady of the Immaculate Concepcion	Concepcion	1957
4	Parish of St. Jude Thaddeus	Corcuera	1998

== Ecclesiastical District of Tablas ==
I. Vicariate of St. Augustine
Order	Church	Municipality	Established
1	Parish of St. Augustine	San Agustin	1871
2	Parish of Our Lady of the Immaculate Concepcion	Santa Maria	1982
3	Parish of St. Michael, the Archangel	Calatrava	1961
4	Parish of Our Lady of Mount Carmel	San Agustin	1993

II. Vicariate of St. Vincent Ferrer
Order	Church	Municipality	Established
1	Parish of St. Vincent Ferrer	Odiongan	1859
2	Parish of St. Anthony de Padua	Ferrol	1982
3	Parish of Our Lady of Candles	Odiongan	1991
4	Parish of St. Andrew	Ferrol	1892

III. Vicariate of St. Joseph, The Spouse of Mary
Order	Church	Municipality	Established
1	Parish of St. Vincent Ferrer	Santa Fe	1954
2	Parish of St. Thomas de Villanueva	Alcantara	1973
3	Parish of St. Isidore, the Worker	Santa Fe	1989
4	Parish of St. Joseph, the Spouse of Mary	Looc	1863
5	Parish of St. Joseph, the Spouse of Mary	San Jose	1982

== Ecclesiastical District of Sibuyan ==
I. Vicariate of Sta. Barbara
Order	Church	Municipality	Established
1	Parish of Our Lady of Immaculate Conception	San Fernando	1881
2	Parish of Our Lady of the Most Holy Rosary	Magdiwang	1868
3	Parish of Sto. Niño	Cajidiocan	1987
4	Parish of Sta. Barbara	Cajidiocan	1848
5	Parish of Our Lady of Remedy	San Fernando	1979

== See also ==
- Catholic Church in the Philippines
- Bishop of Romblon
